= Duan Wenchang =

Duan Wenchang (Chinese: 段文昌; 773 – April 1, 835), courtesy names Moqing (墨卿) and Jingchu (景初), was an official of the Chinese Tang dynasty who served as a chancellor during the reign of Emperor Muzong.

== Background ==
Duan Wenchang was born in 773, during the reign of Emperor Daizong. His great-great-grandfather Duan Zhixuan (段志玄) was one of the major contributors to the establishment of Tang rule, and thus received two great honors—being buried near the tomb of Emperor Taizong and having his portrait being one of the 24 Portraits at Lingyan Pavilion. His great-grandfather Duan Guan (段瓘) served as a county magistrate; his grandfather Duan Huaichang (段懷昶) served as a prefectural military advisor; and his father Duan E (段諤) served as a prefectural prefect.

By Duan Wenchang's time, his family, although originally from Qi Prefecture (齊州, in modern Zibo, Shandong), had been living at Jing Prefecture (荊州, in modern Jingzhou, Hubei). Duan Wenchang, in his youth, became known for his integrity and righteousness, and while this was known by the military governor (jiedushi) of the region, Jingnan Circuit (荊南, headquartered in modern Jingzhou), Pei Zhou (裴冑) and Pei respected him for this, Pei did not invite him to serve on staff. However, Wei Gao the military governor of Xichuan Circuit (西川, headquartered in modern Chengdu, Sichuan) heard about him and invited him to serve on staff. While the future chancellor Li Jifu was serving as the prefect of Zhong Prefecture (忠州, in modern Chongqing), a part of Xichuan Circuit, he and Duan had correspondences.

== During Emperor Xianzong's reign ==
In 806, by which time Emperor Dezong's grandson Emperor Xianzong was emperor, Wei Gao's successor Liu Pi rebelled against imperial rule, but was soon defeated and captured by the imperial general Gao Chongwen. Duan Wenchang, along with several other members of Liu's staff, wore mourning clothes and met Gao to ask for forgiveness. Gao treated them with respect and released them, recommending several of them for promotions, but stated to Duan, "You, sir, will one day be a major general or chancellor. I do not dare to recommend you."

Meanwhile, in 807, Li Jifu became chancellor. Both he and Pei Ji recommended Duan, and Duan was made the magistrate of Dengfeng County. He was soon thereafter made an imperial censor with the title Jiancha Yushi (監察御史), then Zuo Bujue (左補闕), a consultant at the examination bureau of government (門下省, Menxia Sheng). He was later made Cibu Yuanwailang (祠部員外郎), a low-level official at the ministry of rites (禮部, Libu). In 816, he was made an imperial scholar with the title Hanlin Xueshi (翰林學士), while keeping his office as Cibu Yuanwailang as well. (As Duan was a son-in-law to the deceased chancellor Wu Yuanheng, the chancellor Wei Guanzhi, who did not have a friendly relationship with Wu, opposed Emperor Xianzong's previous proposal to make Duan an imperial scholar; only after Wei's removal in 816 was Duan made imperial scholar with the support of the new chancellor Li Fengji.) In 819, Duan was further given the responsibility of drafting imperial edicts.

== During Emperor Muzong's reign ==
In spring 820, Emperor Xianzong died and was succeeded by his son Emperor Muzong. It was said that the very same day that Emperor Muzong took the throne, he summoned Duan Wenchang, along with two scholars that attended to Emperor Muzong's studies while he was Crown Prince, Xue Fang (薛放) and Ding Gongzhu (丁公著), for a meeting. When Emperor Muzong initially wanted to make Xue and Ding chancellors, they declined, and instead, Duan was made Zhongshu Shilang (中書侍郎), the deputy head of the legislative bureau (中書省), and de facto chancellor with the title Tong Zhongshu Menxia Pingzhangshi (同中書門下平章事), along with Xiao Mian.

While serving as chancellor with Xiao, both Xiao and Duan were blamed for a major policy misstep that cost the imperial government its control over the region north of the Yellow River. Both he and Xiao thought that the realm had been permanently pacified after Emperor Xianzong's campaigns against warlords, which destroyed many warlords and caused others to agree to follow imperial orders. He and Xiao submitted a proposal that secret orders be sent to each army, ordering them to reduce armies by forced attrition—such that each army was required to reduce its size by 8% each year by desertions or death. As Emperor Muzong, new to the throne, was spent much of his time in drinking and feasting, he did not see the problems with this proposal and approved it. The soldiers removed from army ranks as a result gathered as bandits as a result, and later, when Lulong (盧龍, headquartered in modern Beijing) and Chengde (成德, headquartered in modern Shijiazhuang, Hebei) Circuits rebelled under the leadership of Zhu Kerong and Wang Tingcou respectively in 821 (by which time Xiao was no longer chancellor), the former soldiers joined Lulong and Chengde forces in droves, and as they were experienced soldiers and the soldiers that the imperial armies were forced to gather quickly in response were inexperienced, the Lulong and Chengde forces eventually prevailed over imperial forces despite a major numerical disadvantage—with Lulong and Chengde having less than 20,000 soldiers combined and the imperial forces numbering 150,000.

In spring 821, it was said that then-military governor of Xichuan, Wang Bo, was making many attempts in official circles to become chancellor, including bribing the powerful eunuchs. Duan also was trying to affect the situation on Wang's behalf. Xiao opposed Wang's ascension, and when Emperor Muzong would not listen to Xiao, Xiao resigned. Shortly thereafter, Duan also offered to resign, and he was made the military governor of Xichuan, while Wang was kept at the capital Chang'an to serve as the minister of justice and director of salt and iron monopolies. He continued to carry the Tong Zhongshu Menxia Pingzhangshi title as an honorary title.

Shortly after Duan was sent to Xichuan, a major scandal broke over high-level officials' influence over the imperial examination results that year. Both Duan and the imperial scholar Li Shen had submitted a list of examinees that they hoped would be passed to Qian Hui (錢徽), one of the officials in charge of the examinations that season, but once the results were published, the examinees that Duan and Li Shen recommended did not pass, while those who passed included the several relatives of other officials—Zheng Tan's brother Zheng Lang; Pei Du's son Pei Zhuan (裴譔); Li Zongmin's son-in-law Su Chao (蘇巢); and Yang Yinshi (楊殷士), brother to the other official in charge of the examinations that year, Yang Rushi (楊汝士). Duan complained to Emperor Muzong that the examinations that year were not fair. When Emperor Muzong consulted imperial scholars, several imperial scholars who were political enemies of Li Zongmin, including Li Deyu, Yuan Zhen, and Li Shen, all agreed with Duan. Emperor Muzong thus ordered a reexamination, while demoting Qian, Li Zongmin, and Yang Rushi, along with 10 examinees who passed based on perceived influence. When Qian's friends subsequently suggested that he submit Duan's and Li Shen's letters trying to influence the examinations to the emperor to show that they were the ones trying to influence results, Qian, who believed that revealing these private letters was inappropriate, burned them. (This was considered a precipitating event to a partisan struggle among Tang officials later known as the Niu-Li Factional Struggles.)

Meanwhile, because Duan was familiar with the customs of the Xichuan people, it was said that he governed with lenience and decisiveness, and that the non-Han people around the circuit respected and feared him. In 822, when Nanzhao attacked Tang territory, Duan sent an emissary and was able to persuade Nanzhao forces to withdraw.

== During Emperor Jingzong's and Emperor Wenzong's reigns ==
After Emperor Muzong died in 824 and was succeeded by his son Emperor Jingzong, Duan Wenchang was recalled to Chang'an to serve as the minister of justice (刑部尚書, Xingbu Shangshu). He was later made minister of defense (兵部尚書, Bingbu Shangshu), as well as acting Shangshu Zuo Cheng (尚書左丞), one of the Secretaries General of the executive bureau (尚書省, Shangshu Sheng).

After Emperor Jingzong died in 826 and was succeeded by his brother Emperor Wenzong, Duan was made chief imperial censor (御史大夫, Yushi Daifu). Soon thereafter, he was made the military governor of Huainan Circuit (淮南, headquartered in modern Yangzhou, Jiangsu), carrying an honorary chancellor title of Tong Zhongshu Menxia Pingzhangshi. In 830, he was moved to Jingnan Circuit (荊南, headquartered in modern Jingzhou, Hubei). As Duan's ancestors had kept mansions in both Jingnan and Xichuan, he bought those mansions back from current owners and converted them into Buddhist temples. As many of his ancestors were buried at Jingnan, he also built a new ancestral shrine, and he often offered sacrifices to his ancestors as well as presenting dances and music to them, in contravention to the usual Confucian customs of ancestor worship, and therefore was criticized.

In 832, Duan was moved back to Xichuan Circuit. In 835, when the imperial eunuch was at Xichuan to deliver new spring uniforms for the soldiers, Duan attended the ceremony for the eunuch to read the imperial edict, and died at the ceremony after the edict was read, without apparent illness. He was given posthumous honors, and he left a 30-volume collection of his works.

It was said that after Duan became prominent, he spent much wealth on clothes, decorations, singing boys, and prostitutes, and was much criticized for this.

== Notes and references ==
- Old Book of Tang, vol. 167.
- New Book of Tang, vol. 89.
- Zizhi Tongjian, vols. 237, 241, 242, 244.
