= Wang Zhixing =

Chinese Tang dynasty general (758–836)

- Traditional Chinese: 王智興
- Simplified Chinese: 王智兴
Transcriptions
Standard Mandarin
- Hanyu Pinyin: Wáng Zhìxìng
- Wade–Giles: Wang Chih-hsing

Other names

Kuangjian (Courtesy name)
- Traditional Chinese: 匡諫
- Simplified Chinese: 匡谏
Transcriptions
Standard Mandarin
- Hanyu Pinyin: Kuāngjiàn
- Wade–Giles: K‘uang-chien

Prince of Yanmen
- Traditional Chinese: 雁門王 鴈門王
- Simplified Chinese: 雁门王
- Literal meaning: King of Wild Goose Pass; Prince of Wild Goose Pass
Transcriptions
Standard Mandarin
- Hanyu Pinyin: Yànménwáng
- Wade–Giles: Yen-mên Wang

Wang Zhixing (758 – August 21, 836), courtesy name Kuangjian and formally the Prince of Yanmen, was a general of the Chinese dynasty Tang dynasty. He had long served as an officer at Wuning Circuit (武寧, headquartered in modern Xuzhou, Jiangsu) before seizing control of the circuit from the imperially-commissioned military governor (Jiedushi) Cui Qun, but subsequently often contributed to imperial campaigns against other generals.

== Background and early career ==
Wang Zhixing was born in 758, during the reign of Emperor Suzong. His family was from Huai Prefecture (懷州, in modern Jiaozuo, Henan). His great-grandfather Wang Jing (王靖) and Wang Gui (王瓌) had both served as imperial guard generals, while his father Wang Jin (王縉) served as a staff member for a crown prince.

It was said that Wang Zhixing was a ferocious warrior while young, and he served as a soldier under Li Wei (李洧) the prefect of Xu Prefecture (徐州, in modern Xuzhou, Jiangsu). (Li Wei was the cousin of Li Zhengji, a warlord that then ruled Pinglu Circuit (平盧, headquartered in modern Tai'an, Shandong) de facto independently from the imperial government, and Xu Prefecture was a part of Pinglu.)

Li Zhengji died in 781, and his son Li Na, without approval from then-reigning Emperor Dezong (Emperor Suzong's grandson), took over Pinglu. In response, Li Na aligned himself with several other warlords in similar situations — Tian Yue, who controlled Weibo Circuit (魏博, headquartered in modern Handan, Hebei), Wang Wujun, who controlled Chengde Circuit (成德, headquartered in modern Shijiazhuang, Hebei), and Zhu Tao, who controlled Lulong Circuit (盧龍, headquartered in modern Beijing). Li Wei's subordinate, Bai Jigeng (白季庚), then persuaded Li Wei to submit to the imperial government instead, and Li Wei did so. Li Na then went his officer Wang Wen (王溫), along with the Weibo officer Xindu Chongqing (信都崇慶), to attack Xu Prefecture. Li Wei sent Wang Zhixing to seek aid from the imperial government, and Wang Zhixing was said to be so fast in his ability to walk that he got to the imperial capital Chang'an within five days. Imperial forces were launched, and they defeated the combined Pinglu and Weibo forces, saving Xu Prefecture. After this battle, Wang Zhixing was often given commands to resist Li Na, and he served at Xu Prefecture over 20 years.

In 815, during the middle of the campaign by Emperor Dezong's grandson Emperor Xianzong against the warlord Wu Yuanji, who then controlled Zhangyi Circuit (彰義, headquartered in modern Zhumadian, Henan), Li Na's son Li Shidao, then ruling Pinglu and aligned with Wu, tried to distract the imperial troops to try to save Wu. He decided to attack Xu Prefecture, which had by then been made the capital of Wuning Circuit (武寧). Wuning's military governor Li Yuan (李愿) put Wang in command of an army to resist the Pinglu attack, and Wang repeatedly prevailed against Pinglu troops. (During one of the battles, he captured a Pinglu general's beautiful concubine. Fearing that his own officers would fight over her, he stated, "Having a woman in the army will surely lead to defeat. Although she is innocent, her presence violates military law." He then beheaded her.) In 818, during the subsequent imperial campaign against Li Shidao, Wang commanded Wuning troops, and they, in conjunction with troops from Zhongwu Circuit (忠武, headquartered in modern Xuchang, Henan), defeated Pinglu troops at Jinxiang (金鄉, in modern Jining, Shandong). After Li Shidao was eventually killed by his own general Liu Wu, and Pinglu surrendered, Wang was made the prefect of Yi Prefecture (沂州, in modern Linyi, Shandong).

== Seizure of Wuning Circuit ==
In 821, by which time Emperor Xianzong's son Emperor Muzong was emperor, Chengde and Lulong Circuits, which had briefly submitted to the imperial government, had again rebelled under the leadership of Wang Tingcou and Zhu Kerong, respectively. While preparing for the campaign against Chengde and Lulong rebels, Emperor Muzong, who had heard of Wang Zhixing's prowess on the battlefield, made him the deputy military governor of Wuning, serving under the military governor Cui Qun (a former chancellor).

Subsequently, Wang Zhixing was commissioned to command 3,000 elite Wuning soldiers against the Chengde and Lulong rebels. Cui was apprehensive of the soldiers' support of Wang, and made a request to the imperial government that Wang be made military governor, or otherwise be given a post at Chang'an. Before the imperial government could respond, Wang became aware of Cui's suspicions toward him. When, in spring 822, Emperor Muzong ended the campaign by pardoning Wang Tingcou and Zhu and the troops from the circuits were sent back to their homes, Wang Zhixing, ahead of the scheduled return time, led the troops back to Wuning. Cui became fearful and, while sending messengers to welcome the troops, ordered them to drop their arms and armor and enter Xu Prefecture unarmed. Wang Zhixing refused and approached the prefectural capital. His supporters opened the city gates to welcome him. He executed a number of people who opposed him and entered the headquarters. He bowed to Cui and the eunuch monitor of the army, and stated, "This is what the troops want. I have no control over them." He then prepared a sendoff for Cui, his secretary, and attendants, and escorted them to Yongqiao. He then seized the money, silk, and textiles stored at Wuning by the directorate of salt and iron monopolies, as well as the tributes that the circuits were submitting to the emperor that were passing through Wuning. He also seized two thirds of the assets of businessmen in or passing through the circuit. He also sent 2,000 soldiers to attack Hao Prefecture (濠州, in modern Chuzhou, Anhui); its prefect Hou Hongdu (侯弘度) abandoned it and fled. The imperial government felt that it had no ability to attack Wang, and Emperor Muzong thus made him the military governor of Wuning.

== Later career ==
After Wang Zhixing took over Wuning Circuit, however, he participated in the imperial government's campaigns against other rebellious generals. For example, later in 822, when soldiers of neighboring Xuanwu Circuit (宣武, headquartered in modern Kaifeng, Henan) expelled Li Yuan (who was then Xuanwu's military governor) under the leadership of Li Jie (李㝏), Wang Zhixing aided Gao Chengjian (高承簡) the prefect of Song Prefecture (宋州, in modern Shangqiu, Henan), who was resisting Li Jie's attacks. With Wang's help, Gao was able to repel Li Jie's attacks, and subsequently, with other imperial troops converging on Xuanwu, Li Jie was killed by his own subordinates.

While at Wuning, Wang used the wealth that he gathered to bribe powerful imperial officials, to rehabilitate his reputation. As a result, he received a number of honorific titles. In 824, by which time Emperor Muzong's son Emperor Jingzong were emperor, Wang requested permission for him to let people take tonsure (i.e., to become Buddhist monks) at Si Prefecture (泗州, in modern Huai'an, Jiangsu), to seek divine favors for Emperor Jingzong. Emperor Jingzong initially agreed. As a result, people were rushing to Si Prefecture to take tonsure, to avoid taxes; the fees they paid caused Wang to become even more wealthy. When Li Deyu the governor of Zhexi Circuit (浙西, headquartered in modern Zhenjiang, Jiangsu) submitted an objection and pointed out that if this continued, Zhexi and its neighboring circuits would lose some 600,000 battle-capable young men, Emperor Jingzong ordered a stop to the practice.

In 826, after the death of Li Quanlüe (李全略) the military governor of Henghai Circuit (橫海, headquartered in modern Cangzhou, Hebei), Li's son Li Tongjie seized control of the circuit and sought to succeed his father. In 827, Emperor Jingzong's brother and successor Emperor Wenzong offered to make Li Tongjie the military governor of Yanhai Circuit (兗海, headquartered in modern Jining) and a former military governor of Henghai, Wu Chongyin, the military governor of Henghai, Li Tongjie refused. As the imperial government subsequently prepared for war against Henghai, Wang offered to attack Henghai without imperial expenditure. (Typically, when circuits send troops on imperial campaigns, the imperial government paid for the soldiers' expenses.) Emperor Wenzong agreed, and subsequently commissioned Wang and several other nearby military governors to converge on Henghai. Subsequently, when Wu died while still on the campaign, Emperor Wenzong made Li Huan (李寰) the military governor of Baoyi Circuit (保義, headquartered in modern Linfen, Shanxi) the military governor of Shanxi, at Wang's request, and further bestowed the honorific chancellor title of Tong Zhongshu Menxia Pingzhangshi (同中書門下平章事) on Wang. (When Li Huan subsequently was slow in reporting to the battlefront, Emperor Wenzong was forced to replace him with Fu Liangbi (傅良弼).) Meanwhile, Wang was able to capture Di Prefecture (棣州, in modern Binzhou, Shandong) and was given the honorific title of acting Situ (司徒, one of the Three Excellencies).

Meanwhile, by this point, Wang was cruel to his soldiers. Meanwhile, his officer Shi Xiong was considered a fierce soldier and treated soldiers well. The soldiers were therefore considering expelling Wang and replacing him with Shi. When Wang became aware of this, Wang requested that Shi be promoted for his battlefield achievements. Emperor Wenzong agreed, and made Shi the prefect of Bi Prefecture (壁州, in modern Bazhong, Sichuan). As soon as Shi left Wuning, Wang slaughtered some 100 officials who were friendly to Shi, and accused Shi of treason, requesting Shi's execution. Emperor Wenzong, while aware that this was a false accusation, could not resist Wang. He declared Shi guilty, but did not execute Shi, instead exiling Shi to Bai Prefecture (白州, in modern Yulin, Guangxi).

In winter 829, Wang went to Chang'an to pay homage to Emperor Wenzong. He was subsequently made the military governor of Zhongwu Circuit as well as the prefect of its capital prefecture Xu Prefecture (許州). In 833, he was made the military governor of Hezhong Circuit (河中, headquartered in modern Yuncheng, Shanxi), as well as the mayor of its capital Hezhong Municipality. In 835, he was made the military governor of Xuanwu and the prefect of its capital Bian Prefecture (汴州). He died in 836 and was given posthumous honors. He was buried near the eastern capital Luoyang, and it was said that some 1,000 officers from the four circuits he served attended the funeral. His son Wang Zai later became a well-known general as well.
