= Cui Zhi =

Cui Zhi (Chinese: 崔植) (772 – March 2, 829), courtesy name Gongxiu (公修), was an official of the Tang dynasty of China, serving as a chancellor during the reign of the Emperor Muzong. Both he and his cousin Cui Ling (崔倰) were blamed for policy missteps that led to the Tang imperial government's loss of control over circuits north of the Yellow River.

== Background ==
Cui Zhi was born in 772, during the reign of Emperor Daizong. His father Cui Yingfu (崔嬰甫) served as the magistrate of Lujiang County (廬江, in modern Chaohu, Anhui) and was a younger brother to the official Cui Youfu, who would eventually serve as a chancellor during the early years of the reign of Emperor Daizong's son Emperor Dezong. When Cui Youfu died in 780 without a son, he designated Cui Zhi as his heir, and Cui Zhi was adopted into Cui Youfu's line. Cui Zhi was said to be studious in the Confucian classics and histories, particularly the I Ching.

== During Emperor Xianzong's reign ==
As of 818, during the reign of Emperor Dezong's grandson Emperor Xianzong, Cui Zhi was serving as an imperial attendant (給事中), when the chancellor Huangfu Bo, who was known for pleasing Emperor Xianzong by finding additional revenues for him, proposed that the officials' salaries be reduced. When Emperor Xianzong issued an edict to that effect, Cui, as he had the authority to do so as Jishizhong, sealed the edict, returned it to Emperor Xianzong, and submitted a petition arguing at length why the proposal was a poorly-conceived one. With Cui's opposition, Emperor Xianzong abandoned the proposal. Cui was soon made deputy chief imperial censor (御史中丞).

== During Emperor Muzong's reign ==
In 820, after Emperor Xianzong had died earlier in the year and been succeeded by his son Emperor Muzong, Cui was made Zhongshu Shilang (中書侍郎), the deputy head of the legislative bureau of government (中書省, Zhongshu Sheng), and de facto chancellor with the title Tong Zhongshu Menxia Pingzhangshi (同中書門下平章事).

In 821, Liu Zong the military governor (Jiedushi) of Lulong Circuit (盧龍, headquartered in Beijing), whose circuit had long been ruled in a de facto independent manner from the imperial government, offered to resign and surrender control of the circuit to the imperial government. To try to ensure that the people of the circuit would submit to imperial rule, Liu proposed that the circuit be divided into three circuits, recommending the former chancellor Zhang Hongjing, the general Xue Ping, and the official Lu Shimei (盧士玫) to take over the three circuits, while he also sent a number of officers, such as Zhu Kerong, that he found difficult to control to the capital Chang'an, asking that they be given commissions and honors so that the soldiers of Lulong would be encouraged by the examples to obey imperial orders. Emperor Muzong accepted Liu's submission, but did not fully implement Liu's partition plan; two prefectures of Lulong were given to Lu, but the remaining prefectures were all given to Zhang, under the suggestion of Cui and fellow chancellor Du Yuanying, who did not understand the rationale of Liu's plan. Further, Zhu and the other officers that Liu sent to Chang'an were not given offices or salaries, and it was said that as they lacked income, they fell into financial desperation, even requiring loans for their food and clothing, despite their frequent submission of requests for offices to Cui and Du. When Zhang arrived at Lulong, he ordered Zhu and the others to return to Lulong, further angering them. In fall 821, Lulong soldiers mutinied and put Zhang and Lu under arrest, supporting Zhu as their leader.

Meanwhile, Cui Zhi's cousin Cui Ling, then the director of finances, was blamed for mutiny at another circuit, Chengde Circuit (成德, headquartered in modern Shijiazhuang, Hebei). Chengde, like Lulong, had been long ruled de facto independently from the imperial government until Emperor Xianzong's lengthy campaigns forced it into submission. After Wang Chengzong, the last in a line of his family who served as military governor-rulers of the circuit, died in 820, Emperor Muzong made Tian Hongzheng, the military governor of neighboring Weibo Circuit (魏博, headquartered in modern Handan, Hebei), military governor of Chengde. As Tian had battled Chengde troops for years, he believed that the Chengde soldiers would resent him deeply, so he took 2,000 Weibo soldiers with him to Chengde to protect himself. He requested the imperial directory of finances to pay for the soldiers. However, Cui Ling, not realizing how serious the situation was, believed that given that Tian commanded Chengde troops, Chengde troops had the responsibility of protecting him, and thus refused to pay to allow the Weibo soldiers to remain. After Tian submitted four petitions to no avail, he was forced to return the Weibo troops to Weibo. In fall 821, shortly after the Lulong mutiny, the Chengde soldiers mutinied under the leadership of Wang Tingcou and killed Tian. Subsequently, when the imperial troops were unable to defeat Lulong and Chengde troops, Emperor Muzong was forced to commission Zhu and Wang as military governors, leading to the effective loss of Lulong and Chengde (and Weibo shortly after).

As the popular sentiment at the time blamed Cui Zhi and Cui Ling for the loss of the region north of the Yellow River, Cui Zhi became embarrassed. Shortly after he was removed from his chancellor position and made the minister of justice (刑部尚書, Xingbu Shangshu). He was soon made the governor (Guanchashi, 觀察使) of Eyue Circuit (鄂岳, headquartered in modern Wuhan, Hubei).

== During Emperor Jingzong's and Emperor Wenzong's reigns ==
After Emperor Muzong died in 824 and was succeeded by his son Emperor Jingzong, Cui Zhi was made the military governor of Lingnan Circuit (嶺南, headquartered in modern Guangzhou, Guangdong) as well as the prefect of its capital Guang Prefecture (廣州). In 827, by which time Emperor Jingzong's brother Emperor Wenzong was emperor, Cui was recalled to the capital to serve as minister of census (戶部尚書, Hubu Shangshu). In 828, Cui was made the prefect of Hua Prefecture (華州, in modern Weinan, Shaanxi) and the commander of Zhen'guo Army (鎮國軍), stationed at Hua Prefecture. He died in 829 while at Hua Prefecture.

== Notes and references ==
- Old Book of Tang, vol. 119.
- New Book of Tang, vol. 142.
- Zizhi Tongjian, vols. 240, 241, 242.
