= Du Yuanying =

Du Yuanying (杜元穎; 769–833), noble title Baron of Jian'an (建安男), was an official of China's Tang dynasty, serving as a chancellor during the reign of Emperor Muzong. His policy error while being chancellor was blamed for the imperial government's losing control over the circuits north of the Yellow River. While later serving as the military governor (Jiedushi) of Xichuan Circuit (西川; headquartered in modern-day Chengdu), he was further blamed for failure of discipline that caused his soldiers to provoke a major Nanzhao invasion of Xichuan, leading to his exile.

== Background ==
Du Yuanying was born in 769, during the reign of Emperor Daizong. Traditional histories indicate that he was from the same clan as the famous early-Tang dynasty chancellor Du Ruhui, but provide conflicting accounts as to whether he was descended from Du Ruhui – with Du Yuanying's biography in the Old Book of Tang indicating that he was a "descendant" of Du Ruhui's; his biography in the New Book of Tang indicating that he was a fifth-generation descendant of Du Ruhui's; the table of the chancellors' family trees in the New Book of Tang indicating that he was a descendant of Du Ruhui's uncle Du Yan, who was himself a chancellor as well; and the Zizhi Tongjian, apparently adopting that latter assertion, indicating that he was a descendant of Du Yan's. In any case, the Du clan claimed original ancestry from the Zhou dynasty states Tang and Du and traced its ancestry to officials of Lu, Chu, Qin dynasty, Han dynasty, Cao Wei, Jin dynasty (266–420), Sui dynasty, and Tang. Neither Du Yuanying's great-grandfather Du Ziyuan (杜自遠) nor grandfather Du Fan (杜繁) was listed with any offices, although Du Yuanying's father Du Zuo (杜佐) served as a judge at the supreme court. Du Yuanying had at least one younger brother, Du Yuanjiang (杜元絳). Du Yuanying himself passed the imperial examinations late in the Zhenyuan era (785–805) of Emperor Daizong's son Emperor Dezong, and thereafter served on the staff of a regional governor.

== During Emperor Xianzong's reign ==
During the middle of the Yuanhe era (805–821) of Emperor Dezong's grandson Emperor Xianzong, Du Yuanying became a Zuo Shiyi (左拾遺), a low-level consultant at the examination bureau of government (門下省, Menxia Sheng); and then a You Bujue (右補闕), a higher-ranked consultant at the legislative bureau (中書省, Zhongshu Sheng). He was then also made an imperial scholar (翰林學士, Hanlin Xueshi). Du wrote things quickly and much impressed Emperor Xianzong. After Emperor Xianzong destroyed the warlord Wu Yuanji in 817, Du, on account of his diligence in drafting edicts during the campaign against Wu, was given a special honor of a red fish-shaped handbag that would be used for officials of higher ranks. (Red-colored uniforms and accessories were to be used by officials of the fourth and fifth ranks, while You Bujue was only seventh rank.) He thereafter was made Sixun Yuanwailang (司勳員外郎), a low-level official at the ministry of civil service affairs (吏部, Libu), but continued to serve as imperial scholar.

== During Emperor Muzong's reign ==
Emperor Xianzong died in 820 and was succeeded by his son Emperor Muzong. Immediately after Emperor Muzong's ascension, he summoned Du Yuanying for a meeting and promoted him to be Zhongshu Sheren (中書舍人), a mid-level official at the legislative bureau. Later that year, Emperor Muzong made Du the deputy minister of census (戶部侍郎, Hubu Shilang) and the chief imperial scholar (承旨, Chengzhi). In 821, he gave Du the title Tong Zhongshu Menxia Pingzhangshi (同中書門下平章事), making Du a chancellor de facto. Emperor Muzong also created him the Baron of Jian'an. It was said that no chancellor had ever risen so quickly on the path that Du took as an official responsible for imperial edicts.

In 821, Liu Zong the military governor (Jiedushi) of Lulong Circuit (盧龍, headquartered in Beijing), whose circuit had long been ruled in a de facto independent manner from the imperial government, offered to resign and surrender control of the circuit to the imperial government. To try to ensure that the people of the circuit would submit to imperial rule, Liu proposed that the circuit be divided into three circuits, recommending the former chancellor Zhang Hongjing, the general Xue Ping, and the official Lu Shimei (盧士玫) to take over the three circuits, while he also sent a number of officers, such as Zhu Kerong, that he found difficult to control to the capital Chang'an, asking that they be given commissions and honors so that the soldiers of Lulong would be encouraged by the examples to obey imperial orders. Emperor Muzong accepted Liu's submission, but did not fully implement Liu's partition plan; two prefectures of Lulong were given to Lu, but the remaining prefectures were all given to Zhang, under the suggestion of Du and fellow chancellor Cui Zhi, who did not understand the rationale of Liu's plan. Further, Zhu and the other officers that Liu sent to Chang'an were not given offices or salaries, and it was said that as they lacked income, they fell into financial desperation, even requiring loans for their food and clothing, despite their frequent submission of requests for offices to Cui and Du. When Zhang arrived at Lulong, he ordered Zhu and the others to return to Lulong, further angering them. In fall 821, Lulong soldiers mutinied and put Zhang and Lu under arrest, supporting Zhu as their leader. Eventually, the imperial government lost control not only of Lulong, but also of Chengde (成德, headquartered in modern Shijiazhuang, Hebei) and Weibo (魏博, headquartered in modern Handan, Hebei) Circuits, and traditional historians blamed the losses on Du, Cui, and fellow chancellor Wang Bo for their incompetence.

In 822, a mutiny occurred at Xuanwu Circuit (宣武, headquartered in modern Kaifeng, Henan), led by the officer Li Jie (李㝏), that expelled the military governor Li Yuan (李愿). Du and the director of finances Zhang Pingshu (張平叔) advocated placating Li Jie by making him military governor, while fellow chancellor Li Fengji advocated a campaign against Li Jie. Emperor Muzong accepted Li Fengji's suggestion, and Li Jie was soon killed by his own subordinate Li Zhi (李質), who then surrendered to imperial authority.

In 823, Du was sent out of the capital to serve as the military governor of Xichuan Circuit (西川, headquartered in modern Chengdu, Sichuan), still carrying the Tong Zhongshu Menxia Pingzhangshi title as an honorary title.

== During Emperor Jingzong's and Emperor Wenzong's reigns ==
Emperor Muzong died in 824 and was succeeded by his son Emperor Jingzong. Because Emperor Jingzong was young, playful, and liked extravagant things, Du Yuanying, in order to please the emperor, often offered rare and valuable treasures to Emperor Jingzong. Du was thus harsh with his people in extracting wealth and treasures, and this caused much resentment toward him. Du was also said to be corrupt and had diverted funds from the soldiers' salaries and clothing and food stipends, and to lack knowledge in military matters. Meanwhile, Li Fengji had accused Du and Li Shen of having supported Emperor Muzong's brother Li Cong (李悰) the Prince of Shen as Emperor Muzong's successor, but any suspicions of Emperor Jingzong on that issue were dissipated after he found, in Emperor Muzong's archives, petitions from Du and Li Shen requesting that he be made crown prince.

Over the years, because of Du's mistreatment of the soldiers, the soldiers, lacking food and clothing, were forced to pillage the borders of Nanzhao in order to have sufficient supplies. Nanzhao reacted by giving gifts of clothing and food to these Tang soldiers in exchange for information about Xichuan Circuit. As a result, Nanzhao became highly aware of Xichuan's vulnerabilities. By 829, at which time Emperor Jingzong's brother Emperor Wenzong was emperor, the Nanzhao prince Mengcuodian (蒙嵯顛) was planning a major attack against Xichuan. When the border prefectures received rumors of Mengcuodian's plans, their warnings to Du were unheeded, and thus, when Mengcuodian, guided by Xichuan soldiers who resented Du, launched his attack, he encountered no resistance, quickly capturing Xi (雟州, in modern Liangshan Yi Autonomous Prefecture, Sichuan) and Rong (戎州, in modern Yibin, Sichuan) Prefectures. Du sent forces to resist Mengcuodian, but after Mengcuodian defeated Xichuan forces, Qiong Prefecture fell to Nanzhao as well. Nanzhao forces put Chengdu under siege and entered its western city, while forward troops reached as far as Zi Prefecture (梓州, in modern Mianyang, Sichuan), the headquarters of Xichuan's neighboring circuit Dongchuan (東川). Nanzhao forces stayed at Chengdu's western city for 10 days before pillaging Chengdu and withdrawing, taking with them tens of thousands of Xichuan craftspeople and young men and women. It was said that after this incident, Nanzhao had crafts capabilities rivaling Xichuan. Emperor Wenzong initially demoted Du to be the prefect of Shao Prefecture (邵州, in modern Shaoyang, Hunan). After Mengcuodian submitted a petition accusing Du of crimes and explaining the reasons for the incursion, and further demanding Du's execution, Emperor Wenzong further demoted Du to be the military advisor to the prefect of Xun Prefecture (循州, in modern Huizhou, Guangdong). Subsequently, the military governor of Dongchuan, Guo Zhao (郭釗), was made the military governor of Xichuan and made peace with Nanzhao. Several of Du's key staff members were likewise demoted. Du died in 833 at Xun Prefecture. Before he died, he submitted a petition begging for posthumous restoration to a higher office, and Emperor Wenzong awarded him a posthumous promotion to prefect. Du Yuanying's nephew Du Shenquan (Du Yuanjiang's son) and Du Shenquan's son Du Rangneng later served as chancellors as well.

== Notes and references ==
- Old Book of Tang, vol. 163.
- New Book of Tang, vol. 96.
- Zizhi Tongjian, vols. vol. 241, 242, 243, 244.
