= Cui Qun =

Chinese chancellor

Cui Qun (崔群) (772 – August 30, 832), courtesy name Dunshi (敦詩), was an official of the Chinese Tang dynasty, serving as a chancellor during the reign of Emperor Xianzong.

== Background ==
Cui Qun was born in 772, during the reign of Emperor Daizong. His family was from Bei Prefecture (貝州, in modern Xingtai, Hebei) and traced its ancestry to a line of officials of Cao Wei, Liu Song, Northern Wei, and Tang dynasty. His grandfather Cui Chao (崔朝) served as a prefectural prefect, while his father Cui Ji (崔積) served as a supervisorial official in the central government. His family was a cadet branch of the Cui clan of Qinghe.

In 790, during the reign of Emperor Daizong's son Emperor Dezong, when Cui Qun was 18, he passed the imperial examinations in the class of those with policy proposals. He was initially made Xiaoshu Lang (校書郎), a copyeditor at the Palace Library, and later was made You Bujue (右補闕), a consultant at the legislative bureau of government (中書省, Zhongshu Sheng).

== During Emperor Xianzong's reign ==
Early in the Yuanhe era (805–821) of Emperor Dezong's grandson Emperor Xianzong, Cui Qun was made Hanlin Xueshi (翰林學士), an imperial scholar. In 810, when the official Yuan Zhen was exiled after a conflict with a eunuch, Cui and his imperial scholar colleagues Li Jiang and Bai Juyi tried to defend Yuan, but they were not listened to. Emperor Xianzong appreciated Cui for his honesty, and in 812, when Cui also carried the title of Kubu Langzhong (庫部郎中), a supervisorial official at the ministry of defense (兵部, Bingbu), he was promoted to be Zhongshu Sheren (中書舍人), a mid-level official at the legislative bureau, but continued to serve as imperial scholar as well. Emperor Xianzong also ordered that, when the other imperial scholars were to submit suggestions, they were to have Cui cosign the petition. Cui, however, opposed this order, pointing out that imperial scholars were to provide advice to the emperor, and that creating this precedent may cause the ability of the imperial scholars to do so be impeded in the future. Emperor Xianzong agreed and rescinded the order.

After Emperor Xianzong's first crown prince Li Ning died in 812, Emperor Xianzong was set to create his son Li You the Prince of Sui, a son of his wife Consort Guo crown prince, but as another son born of a concubine, Li Kuan (李寬) the Prince of Li, was older and had his own supporters among the eunuchs, he had Cui draft a petition in Li Kuan's name offering to yield the crown prince position to Li You. Cui pointed out that to "yield" a position implied an otherwise-entitlement to the position and that, Li You, as the son of a wife, had precedence over a son of a concubine by Confucian principles. Emperor Xianzong agreed and did not have Cui draft such a petition for Li Kuan before creating Li You crown prince (and changing Li You's name to Li Heng). Around the same time, the warlord Tian Ji'an, the military governor (jiedushi) of Weibo Circuit (魏博, headquartered in modern Handan, Hebei), submitted a tribute of silk in the name of assisting with the rebuilding of Kaiye Temple (開業寺). Cui considered the tribute to be improper and advised Emperor Xianzong to decline it, and Emperor Xianzong agreed. Cui often made suggestions that Emperor Xianzong found agreeable and therefore were often accepted by Emperor Xianzong. He was subsequently made the deputy minister of rites (禮部侍郎, Lǐbu Shilang), and in that capacity was said to be fair and proper in his selection of imperial examinees. He was later made the deputy minister of census (戶部侍郎, Hubu Shilang).

In 817, when the chancellor Pei Du left the capital Chang'an to oversee the campaign against the warlord Wu Yuanji, Cui was made Zhongshu Shilang (中書侍郎), the deputy head of the legislative bureau, as well as chancellor de facto with the title Tong Zhongshu Menxia Pingzhangshi (同中書門下平章事). Later that year, when Emperor Xianzong was set to make his close associate Zhang Su (張宿) a high-level consultant, Cui and fellow chancellor Wang Ya opposed, but Emperor Xianzong disagreed with them, only agreeing them when they, as a compromise, had Zhang made an acting consultant. Still, Zhang, as a result, resented the chancellors, and attacked them along with another close associate of Emperor Xianzong's, Huangfu Bo.

In 818, by which time the campaign against Wu had been concluded successfully, Emperor Xianzong made Huangfu and Cheng Yi, both of whom had received favor from him for extracting wealth from the people, chancellors, over the strenuous objections of both Cui and Pei (who was back in Chang'an by this point to serve as chancellor again). Later in the year, when the eunuch Yang Chaowen (楊朝汶) arrested over 1,000 people for owing money to the imperial palace, the deputy chief imperial censor Xiao Mian accused Yang for false arrests, and with Pei and Cui supporting Xiao in his accusation, Emperor Xianzong ordered Yang to commit suicide and released the people Yang arrested. In 819, when the deputy minister of justice Han Yu submitted a fervently-worded petition urging Emperor Xianzong not to carry out a grand ceremony to receive a bone, purportedly of a finger of Gautama Buddha, into the palace, and Emperor Xianzong, in anger, wanted to put Han to death, it was Pei's and Cui's intercession that Han was merely exiled to serve as a prefectural prefect. Later that year, there was an occasion when Emperor Xianzong asked the chancellors why the reign of his ancestor Emperor Xuanzong started out well but ended in disaster. Cui pointed out that initially, Emperor Xuanzong trusted such chancellors as Yao Chong, Song Jing, Lu Huaishen, Su Ting, Han Xiu, and Zhang Jiuling, but late in the reign trusted such chancellors as Yuwen Rong, Li Linfu, and Yang Guozhong, and that it was his poor selection of chancellors at the end that led to the disaster. It was said that because this comment was viewed as directed at Huangfu, Huangfu much resented Cui for the comment. Around that time, after the warlord Li Shidao was killed after an imperial campaign against him, Emperor Xianzong asked for opinions on how to deal with Li Shidao's sister-in-law Lady Pei (the wife of Li Shidao's brother and predecessor Li Shigu), as well as the wife and children of another previously killed rebel, Li Zongshi (李宗奭). Cui advocated lenience, and as a result, Emperor Xianzong released Lady Pei and her daughter Li Yiniang (李宜娘) as well as Li Zongshi's wife Lady Wei and children. Also at Cui's urging, the official Quan Changru (權長儒), who had been sentenced to death after receiving bribes but whose mother Lady Liu had made earnest pleas to the chancellors for his life, was exiled and not executed. It was said in the Old Book of Tang that Cui's nature was merciful and that these actions were in accordance.

Huangfu, meanwhile, struck back at Cui later in 819. Earlier in the year, the officials had offered Emperor Xianzong the honorary title of Emperor Yuanhe Shengwen Shenwu Fatian Yingdao (元和聖文神武法天應道皇帝). Huangfu initially wanted two additional characters—Xiaode (孝德, "filial and virtuous"). Cui opined, "Sheng [(聖)] encompassed filial piety", and therefore did not include them. Huangfu thus told Emperor Xianzong, "Cui did not want Your Imperial Majesty to have the characters 'Xiaode'." At that time, the troops sent to the borders with Tufan were receiving supplies of poor quality and were so displeased that they were on the verge of mutiny—so much so that their commander, the general Li Guangyan, was so distressed to consider suicide. Li Guangyan reported this to Emperor Xianzong, but Huangfu informed Emperor Xianzong that there was nothing wrong with the supplies and that it was Cui who encouraged the soldiers to complain. Emperor Xianzong believed Huangfu, and around the new year 820, Cui was sent out of the capital to serve as the governor (觀察使, Guanchashi) of Hunan Circuit (湖南, headquartered in modern Changsha, Hunan). It was said that because of this action, the people hated Huangfu.

== During Emperor Muzong's and Emperor Jingzong's reigns ==
In 820, after Emperor Xianzong died and was succeeded by Li Heng (as Emperor Muzong), Emperor Muzong recalled Cui Qun to serve as the deputy minister of civil service affairs (吏部侍郎, Lìbu Shilang, note different tone than the deputy minister of rites). When Emperor Muzong summoned him for an audience, Emperor Muzong stated to him, "I know that you had served as my wings in my rise to be crown prince." Cui, however, responded, "The late emperor's favor had long been on Your Imperial Majesty. I did not do anything." Cui was soon made the chief imperial censor (御史大夫, Yushi Daifu), and later in the year was made the military governor of Wuning Circuit (武寧, headquartered in modern Xuzhou, Jiangsu).

By 822, the imperial forces were waging campaigns against the rebels Wang Tingcou and Zhu Kerong, who had seized Chengde (成德, headquartered in modern Shijiazhuang, Hebei) and Lulong (盧龍, headquartered in modern Beijing) Circuits, respectively. Cui's deputy military governor Wang Zhixing was then commanding the Wuning troops at the front. Cui was apprehensive of Wang Zhixing, as Wang Zhixing had the support of the soldiers, and he petitioned that Wang Zhixing be given the military governorship of another circuit or be summoned to Chang'an to be given a position in the imperial government. Emperor Muzong did neither, but Wang Zhixing discovered this and felt that he no longer had Cui's trust. After Emperor Muzong ended the campaigns against Wang Tingcou and Zhu in 822, Wang Zhixing took the Wuning troops back to Wuning and forcibly entered the headquarters, effectively taking Cui and his staff as hostage, although he still treated them with respect but had them escorted out of the circuit, back to Chang'an, while taking over control of the circuit himself. The imperial government, blaming Cui for losing the circuit to Wang Zhixing, gave Cui the office of Mishu Jian (秘書監), the deputy director of the archival bureau, but had him report to the eastern capital Luoyang rather than Chang'an. He was later made the prefect of Hua Prefecture (華州, in modern Weinan, Shaanxi), and yet later made the governor of Xuanshe Circuit (宣歙, headquartered in modern Xuancheng, Anhui) as well as the prefect of its capital Xuan Prefecture (宣州).

== During Emperor Wenzong's reign ==
In 827, by which time Emperor Muzong's son Emperor Wenzong was emperor, Cui Qun was recalled to serve as the minister of defense (兵部尚書, Bingbu Shangshu). In 829, he was made the military governor of Jingnan Circuit (荊南, headquartered in modern Jingzhou, Hubei), as well as the mayor of its capital Jiangling Municipality. In 830, he was recalled to Chang'an to serve as acting You Pushe (右僕射), one of the heads of the executive bureau (尚書省, Shangshu Sheng), as well as the minister of worship (太常卿, Taichang Qing). In 833, he was made acting Zuo Pushe (左僕射), the other head of the executive bureau, as well as the minister of civil service affairs (吏部尚書, Lìbu Shangshu). He died in 834 and was given posthumous honors.

== Notes and references ==
- Old Book of Tang (945), vol. 159. (Compilation for the Emperor of earlier annals.)
- New Book of Tang (1060), vol. 165. (Revision for the Emperor of the Old Book of Tang.)
- Zizhi Tongjian (1084), vols. 238, 240, 241, 242. (Compilation for the Emperor of an history of China.)
