= Zhang Hongjing =

Chinese chancellor

Zhang Hongjing (simplified Chinese: 张弘靖; traditional Chinese: 張弘靖; pinyin: Zhāng Hóngjìng) (760 – July 24, 824), courtesy name Yuanli (元理), formally the Marquess of Gaoping (高平侯), was an official of the Tang dynasty of China, serving as a chancellor during the reign of Emperor Xianzong. He was blamed in traditional histories for misruling Lulong Circuit (盧龍, headquartered in modern Beijing), leading to Lulong soldiers' subsequent rebellion against the imperial government under Zhu Kerong.

== Background ==
Zhang Hongjing was born in 760, during the reign of Emperor Suzong. His family traced its ancestry to the Jin Dynasty official Zhang Hua. His grandfather Zhang Jiazhen had served as a chancellor during the reign of Emperor Suzong's father Emperor Xuanzong, and at the time of Zhang Hongjing's birth, Zhang Hongjing's father Zhang Yanshang was already serving in the imperial government. Zhang Hongjing himself was said to be elegant, lenient, faithful, and honest in his youth.

== During Emperor Dezong's reign ==
During the reign of Emperor Suzong's grandson Emperor Dezong, Zhang Yanshang was serving in progressively more important positions, and eventually served as a chancellor in 787 before dying late that year. Zhang Hongjing, on account of his heritage, was made an officer at Henan Municipality (河南, i.e., the region of the eastern capital Luoyang), and later served as the sheriff of Lantian County (藍田, in modern Xi'an, Shaanxi). When Du Ya (杜亞) served as the defender of Luoyang, he invited Zhang Hongjing to serve as his assistant. There was an occasion when the officer Linghu Yun (令狐運) had been chasing thugs out of the city that a robbery occurred in the same locale. As Linghu belonged to a strong clan, Du came to suspect Linghu of having committed the robbery and asked Zhang and his colleague Mu Yuan (穆員) to investigate. As both Mu and Zhang believed that Linghu would not commit such an act, they asked for the investigation to be suspended. Du refused to listen to them and had LInghu arrested; he also threw Mu and Zhang off his staff. However, a later investigation ordered by Emperor Dezong located the actual robber.

Soon afterwards, when Princess Deyang was set to be married, the mansion that Emperor Dezong was constructing for her would have required the destruction of Zhang's ancestral shrine. Zhang requested an audience with Emperor Dezong, and he pleaded on account of his grandfather's and father's virtues. Emperor Dezong comforted him and ordered that the Zhang ancestral shrine be preserved. Zhang later submitted a poem to Emperor Dezong praising the Tang system of the two capitals (i.e., the main capital Chang'an and Luoyang). Emperor Dezong favored his writing and made him an imperial censor with the title Jiancha Yushi (監察御史), and then the greater title of Dianzhong Shiyushi (殿中侍御史). Zhang later served successively in a number of positions — Libu Yuanwailang (禮部員外郎), a low-level official at the ministry of rites (禮部, Libu); Bingbu Langzhong (兵部郎中), a supervisorial official at the ministry of defense (兵部, Bingbu) (and at this time, he was also in charge of drafting edicts); Zhongshu Sheren (中書舍人), a mid-level official at the legislative bureau of government (中書省, Zhongshu Sheng) (and at the time, he was also in charge of selecting officials to be stationed at Luoyang); deputy minister of public works (工部侍郎, Gongbu Shilang); deputy minister of census (戶部侍郎, Hubu Shilang); governor (觀察使, Guanchashi) of Shan'guo Circuit (陝虢, headquartered in modern Sanmenxia, Henan); and military governor (Jiedushi) of Hezhong Circuit (河中, headquartered in modern Yuncheng, Shanxi).

== During Emperor Xianzong's reign ==
In 814, when Emperor Dezong's grandson Emperor Xianzong was emperor, Zhang Hongjing was recalled to Chang'an and made the minister of justice (刑部尚書) as well as chancellor de facto with the title of Tong Zhongshu Menxia Pingzhangshi (同中書門下平章事). Soon after he became chancellor, the warlord Wu Shaoyang the military governor of Zhangyi Circuit (彰義, headquartered in modern Zhumadian, Henan) died, and at the advice of Zhang's fellow chancellor Li Jifu, Emperor Xianzong prepared for a campaign to seize control of Zhangyi by force if necessary, rather than allowing Wu's son Wu Yuanji to inherit the circuit. Zhang suggested first declaring a mourning period for Wu Shaoyang and then sending a key official to Zhangyi to mourn Wu Shaoyang and observe what Wu Yuanji's attitude was. Emperor Xianzong agreed and sent the official Li Junhe (李君何) to Zhangyi. Wu Yuanji refused to allow Li Junhe to enter his domain and further pillaged the cities of the surrounding circuits, thus leading to a general imperial campaign against Zhangyi. Around this time, Zhang was created the Marquess of Gaoping.

In 815, Zhang's fellow chancellor Wu Yuanheng, who had been put in charge of the campaign against Zhangyi after Li Jifu died late in 814, was assassinated. Suspicions fell on a number of officers from Chengde Circuit (成德, headquartered in modern Shijiazhuang, Hebei) stationed at Chang'an, as Chengde's military governor, Wang Chengzong, was an ally of Wu Yuanji's and had been submitting petitions attacking Wu Yuanheng and urging the end of the campaign against Zhangyi. The Chengde officers were arrested and interrogated, and they confessed to assassinating Wu Yuanheng. Zhang, suspecting that these confessions were extracted by torture, requested further investigations. Emperor Xianzong declined and had them executed, and subsequently declared Wang a renegade, although he did not immediately order a campaign against Wang. However, Wang subsequently reacted by pillaging his surrounding circuits, and Emperor Xianzong was set to do so. Zhang, pointing out that it would be difficult for the empire to maintain two campaigns simultaneously, suggested waiting until the campaign against Zhangyi were complete. Emperor Xianzong did not agree, and Zhang thus offered to resign. In spring 816, Emperor Xianzong thus made Zhang the military governor of Hedong Circuit (河東, headquartered in modern Taiyuan, Shanxi), still carrying the chancellor title as an honorary title. Emperor Xianzong, who did not want to publicly go against Zhang's advice while Zhang remained chancellor, then declared a general campaign against Wang, even before Zhang could arrive at Taiyuan. Zhang prepared the Hedong army and requested to personally command the troops against Wang. Emperor Xianzong allowed him to send his troops but declined his request to personally command them. The imperial army was unsuccessful against Wang, but Wang became fearful after Wu Yuanji was captured and executed in 817, and subsequent submitted to the imperial government and surrendered two of his six prefectures to imperial control.

In 819, after Han Hong the military governor of Xuanwu Circuit (宣武, headquartered in modern Kaifeng, Henan) went to Chang'an to pay homage to Emperor Xianzong and then requested to remain at Chang'an, Zhang was made the military governor of Xuanwu and continued to carry the honorary chancellor title. It was said that when Zhang served at Hedong and Xuanwu, as he succeeded stern military governors, he was lenient and frugal, and the armies and the people were comforted by his leniency and frugality.

== During Emperor Muzong's and Emperor Jingzong's reigns ==
In spring 821, by which time Emperor Xianzong had died and been succeeded by his son Emperor Muzong, Liu Zong the military governor of Lulong Circuit offered to resign and submit his circuit to imperial rule. As Liu was concerned that his officers might not abide by the decision he made, he further proposed that Lulong be divided into three circuits, with the circuit capital, You Prefecture (幽州), along with Zhuo Prefecture (涿州, in modern Baoding, Hebei), be given to Zhang Hongjing; Ji (薊州, in modern Tianjin), Gui (媯州, in modern Zhangjiakou, Hebei), and Tan (檀州, in modern Beijing) Prefectures be given to the general Xue Ping; and Ying (瀛州) and Mo (莫州, both in modern Cangzhou, Hebei) Prefectures be given to the official Lu Shimei (盧士玫). (Liu had made these recommendations on the bases that when Zhang ruled Hedong, which neighbored Lulong, Liu had often heard good opinions of Zhang's governance; that Xue was the son of Xue Song and familiar with the region; and that Lu was a relative of Liu's wife's.) Further, believing that a number of senior army officers, including Zhu Kerong, were difficult to control, he sent them to Chang'an and requested that Emperor Muzong give them promotions.

Emperor Muzong accepted Liu's submission, but did not fully implement Liu's partition plan; Ying and Mo were given to Lu Shimei, but the remaining prefectures were all given to Zhang, under the suggestion of the chancellors Cui Zhi and Du Yuanying, who did not understand the rationale of Liu's plan. Further, Zhu and the other officers that Liu sent to Chang'an were not given offices or salaries, and it was said that as they lacked income, they fell into financial desperation, even requiring loans for their food and clothing, despite their frequent submission of requests for offices to Cui and Du. When Zhang arrived at Lulong, he ordered Zhu and the others to return to Lulong, further angering them. Meanwhile, Zhang further drew the anger of the people and soldiers of Lulong over a number of actions:

- In contrast to the past military governors' willingness to bear the difficulties with the people, including the weather conditions, when Zhang was arriving at You Prefecture, he was in a litter borne by eight men, shocking the people of You Prefecture.
- Zhang Hongjing was solemn and arrogant, not willing to speak with the people, and he rarely accepted advice from guests and the army officers.
- He gave much authority to his assistants Wei Yong (韋雍) and Zhang Zonghou (張宗厚), and these assistants were disrespectful of soldiers and extravagant in their living — such that, shocking to the people of You Prefecture, they were often feasting deep into the night and going home after midnight, with their guards loudly escorting them.
- When Liu submitted to imperial authority, Emperor Muzong ordered a large cash reward for the Lulong soldiers, but Zhang Hongjing took 20% of the award for headquarter expenses.
- The people of You Prefecture had venerated the leading figures of the Anshi Rebellion, An Lushan and Shi Siming, and referred to them as the "Two Holy Men." Zhang Hongjing, wanting to change this custom, had An and Shi exhumed and their caskets destroyed, causing resentment among the people.

In fall 821, when a low-level officer accidentally collided with Wei's guards, Wei ordered the officer whipped, but the other officers were unaccustomed to this kind of punishment and refused to carry out the punishment. Zhang Hongjing had the officers arrested. That night, the soldiers mutinied, killed Wei and several other staff member of Zhang's, and put Zhang under arrest. The next day, the mutineers began to regret their actions, but when they met Zhang to ask for forgiveness, Zhang did not speak at all. The mutineers believed that Zhang was not intending to pardon them, and instead supported Zhu Kerong's father Zhu Hui (朱洄) to serve as the acting military governor. Zhu Hui declined, but recommended Zhu Kerong, and the soldiers agreed.

Upon hearing of the mutiny, Emperor Muzong, intending to calm the mutineers, announced that Zhang would be demoted to be the prefect of Ji Prefecture (吉州, in modern Ji'an, Jiangxi). Zhu Kerong, however, allied with Wang Tingcou, who had around the same time mutinied at and taken over Chengde Circuit, killing the imperial general Tian Hongzheng, and the two circuits waged a campaign against the imperial troops sent to combat the mutinies. Emperor Muzong eventually allowed Zhu Kerong to become the military governor of Lulong in winter 821, and only after receiving his commission did Zhu release Zhang and Lu (whom he also captured).

After Zhang was released, he was made the prefect of Fu Prefecture (撫州, in modern Fuzhou, Jiangxi). He was soon made an advisor to the Crown Prince Li Zhan. He died in 824, shortly after Emperor Muzong's death and Li Zhan's succession to the throne as Emperor Jingzong.

== Notes and references ==
- Old Book of Tang, vol. 129.
- New Book of Tang, vol. 127.
- Zizhi Tongjian, vols. 239, 241, 242.
