= Du Shenquan =

Du Shenquan (杜審權), courtesy name Yinheng (殷衡), formally Duke De of Xiangyang (襄陽德公), was an official of the Chinese Tang dynasty, who served as a chancellor during the reign of Emperor Yizong. (833–873)

== Background ==
It is not known when Du Shenquan was born. He was a sixth-generation descendant of the early Tang dynasty chancellor Du Ruhui. His grandfather Du Zuo (杜佐) served as a judge at the supreme court. His uncle Du Yuanying served as a chancellor during the reign of Emperor Muzong, while his father Du Yuanjiang (杜元絳) served as an advisor for a crown prince.

Both Du Shenquan and his younger brother Du Wei (杜蔚) passed the imperial examinations in the Jinshi class. He thereafter served as an assistant to the governor of Jiangxi Circuit (江西, headquartered in modern Nanchang, Jiangxi), and, after subsequently passing a special imperial examination for those who made good rulings, remained at the capital Chang'an to serve as You Shiyi (右拾遺), a low-level advisory official at the legislative bureau of government (中書省, Zhongshu Sheng). He was later promoted to Zuo Bujue (左補闕), an advisory official at the examination bureau (門下省, Menxia Sheng).

== During Emperor Xuānzong's reign ==
Early in the Dazhong era (847–860) of Emperor Muzong's younger brother Emperor Xuānzong, Du Shenquan was made Sixun Yuanwailang (司勛員外郎), a secondary official at the Ministry of Personnel, and then was promoted to supervisor (郎中, Langzhong). He was later put in charge of drafting edicts, and later made Zhongshu Sheren (中書舍人), a mid-level official at the legislative bureau. In 856, he was put in charge of determining the passage for imperial examinees at the ministry of rites (禮部, Lǐbu, note different tone), and in 857, he selected some 30 of them; it was said that many of them became prominent officials later. He was thereafter made the deputy minister of rites (禮部侍郎, Libu Shilang). That winter, he was sent out of Chang'an to serve as the governor (觀察使, Guanchashi) of Shanguo Circuit (陝虢, headquartered in modern Sanmenxia, Henan). In 859, he was recalled to serve as the deputy minister of census (戶部侍郎), in charge of taxation.

== During Emperor Yizong's reign ==
Emperor Xuānzong died later in 859 and was succeeded by his son Emperor Yizong. Thereafter, Du Shenquan was made the military governor (jiedushi) of Hezhong Circuit (河中, headquartered in modern Yuncheng, Shanxi) as well as the mayor of its capital Hezhong Municipality, but almost immediately thereafter recalled to serve as the deputy minister of defense (兵部侍郎, Bingbu Shilang) and the director of finances, and then made a chancellor de facto with the designation Tong Zhongshu Menxia Pingzhangshi (同中書門下平章事). Because, during the time he served as chancellor, the more senior official Du Cong also served as chancellor, Du Shenquan became known colloquially as "Little Duke Du."

Du Shenquan served as chancellor until 863, when he was sent to Zhenhai Circuit (鎮海, headquartered in modern Zhenjiang, Jiangsu) to serve as its military governor, continuing to carry the Tong Zhongshu Menxia Pingzhangshi title as an honorary chancellor title. During the subsequent 868-869 rebellion by the officer Pang Xun, who seized Xusi Circuit (徐泗, headquartered in modern Xuzhou, Jiangsu) and attacked nearby circuits, Du, along with fellow military governors Linghu Tao (of Huainan Circuit (淮南, headquartered in modern Yangzhou, Jiangsu)) and Cui Xuan (of Shannan East Circuit (山南東道, headquartered in modern Xiangfan, Hubei)) ensured that the supply route for Chang'an and the eastern capital Luoyang was continued to be open despite the rebellion. He also sent troops under his officer Zhai Xingyue (翟行約) to try to lift the siege that Pang's followers Wu Jiong (吳迥) and Liu Ji (劉佶) put Si Prefecture (泗州, in modern Huai'an, Jiangsu) under, although Zhai and his soldiers were subsequently annihilated by the rebels. When Xin Dang (辛讜), a friend of Si's prefect Du Tao (杜慆), subsequently fought his way out of the siege to seek aid from Linghu and Du Shenquan, Du sent another officer, Zhao Yi (趙翼), with 2,000 soldiers and a supply of rice and salt, to join forces with Linghu to try to again lift the siege. Xin, along with the Huai'nan and Zhenhai soldiers, were able to fight their way back into the siege to assist its defense, and subsequently, Ma Ju (馬舉), who had by that point succeeded Linghu as the military governor of Huai'nan, was able to defeat the rebels and lift the siege. After Pang was defeated and killed, for his contributions, Du Shenquan was given the honorary title of acting Sikong (司空, one of the Three Excellencies), and subsequently recalled to Chang'an to serve as Zuo Pushe (左僕射), one of the heads of the executive bureau (尚書省, Shangshu Sheng). He was also created the Duke of Xiangyang. In 870, he was again sent to Hezhong Circuit to serve as its military governor, as well as the mayor of Hezhong. He served there for a few years before he was transferred to Zhongwu Circuit (忠武, headquartered in modern Xuchang, Henan). Yet later, he was made a senior advisor to the Crown Prince, with his office at Luoyang. It is not known when he died, but it is known that after he died, he was given posthumous honors, as well as the posthumous name of De (德, "virtuous"). His son Du Rangneng later served as a chancellor under Emperor Yizong's sons Emperor Xizong and Emperor Zhaozong.

== Notes and references ==
- Old Book of Tang, vol. 177.
- New Book of Tang, vol. 96.
- Zizhi Tongjian, vols. 249, 250, 251.
