= Wang Bo (chancellor) =

Tang Dynasty Chancellor

Wang Bo (王播) (759 – February 15, 830), courtesy name Mingyang (明敭), formally Duke Jing of Taiyuan (太原敬公), was a Chinese politician during the Tang dynasty, serving as a chancellor during the reigns of Emperor Muzong and Emperor Wenzong. In traditional histories, he was credited with his fight against corruption and administrative abilities early in his career, but was blamed for his later corruption, engagement in political intrigue, and extraction of wealth from the people.

== Background ==
Wang Bo was born in 759, during the reign of Emperor Suzong. His ancestors were from Taiyuan, but as his father Wang Shu (王恕) served as an officer in charge of army supplies at Yang Prefecture (揚州, in modern Yangzhou, Jiangsu), the family settled in Yang Prefecture. Wang Bo had at least two younger brothers, Wang Qi (王起) and Wang Yan (王炎).

== During Emperor Dezong's reign ==
During the middle of the Zhenyuan era (785–805) of Emperor Suzong's grandson Emperor Dezong, Wang Bo and his brothers Wang Yan and Wang Qi all became well-known, and they all passed the imperial examinations. Wang Bo and Wang Qi further passed a special examination for the good and righteous. Wang Bo was made an assistant at Jixian Institute (集賢院), and thereafter became an imperial censor, initially with the title Jiancha Yushi (監察御史) then Dianzhong Shiyushi (殿中侍御史). Late in the Zhenyuan era, one of Emperor Dezong's favorite officials, Li Shi (李實) the mayor of Jingzhao Municipality (京兆, i.e., the region of the capital Chang'an), was arrogant, and once, when he encountered Wang on the street, instead of yielding to the censor as was appropriate under the regulations (due to the censors' having the responsibility of examining the officials' deeds), he refused to. Wang wrote a formal letter rebuking him. Li, in anger, recommended to Emperor Dezong that Wang be made the magistrate of Sanyuan County (三原, in modern Xianyang, Shaanxi), which was part of Jingzhao, in order to get a chance to humiliate Wang. Instead of reacting angrily, Wang went to the Jingzhao Municipality government to thank Li for the recommendation as was appropriate under the regulations. It was said that once Wang started his service as the magistrate of Sanyuan, he governed the county well, and the powerful clans of the county did not dare to resist the law. At the end of the year, he was rated the highest among the county magistrates of Jingzhao. Li was impressed and further recommended him for promotion. Emperor Dezong was about to promote him when his mother died, and he left governmental service to observe a mourning period for her.

== During Emperor Shunzong's and Emperor Xianzong's reigns ==
After Emperor Dezong died in 805 and was succeeded by his severely ill son Emperor Shunzong, Wang Bo was recalled to governmental service to serve as Jiabu Yuanwailang (駕部員外郎), a low-level official at the ministry of defense (兵部, Bingbu). When guests of Yu Di the magistrate of Chang'an County (one of the two counties making up the capital) committed horse robbery along with others, the Chang'an county police released the guests, only arresting the other people they were working with. It was at Wang's insistence that all were arrested and punished equally. He was thereafter made Gongbu Langzhong (工部郎中), a supervisorial official at the ministry of public works (工部, Gongbu), but took some of the responsibilities at the office of the imperial censors (御史臺, Yushi Tai) as well. He was said to be capable at finding illegality and acting against them. There happened to be a famine in the region at the time, and it was said that it was because Wang brought it to the emperor's attentions that the people received disaster relief. He later served as the prefect of Guo Prefecture (虢州, in modern Sanmenxia, Henan).

After Li Xun (李巽) became the director of salt and iron monopolies in 806, by which time Emperor Shunzong's son Emperor Xianzong was emperor, at Li's request, Wang was made the deputy director as well as Bingbu Langzhong (兵部郎中), a supervisorial official at the ministry of defense. In 810, Wang became deputy chief imperial censor (御史中丞), replacing Li Yijian, and it was said that he worked hard to reestablish the authority of law. Later in the year, he became the mayor of Jingzhao, replacing Xu Mengrong (許孟容). As, at that time, there were many armies stationed in the Chang'an region, with soldiers frequently carrying swords, a side effect was that there was much banditry because it became difficult to distinguish bandits from soldiers. At Wang's request, orders were issued that soldiers not carry swords in daily lives and that the noble families not be allowed to use hunting equipment within the Chang'an region; these actions were said to be effective in ending the epidemic of banditry in the region.

In 811, Wang was made the deputy minister of justice (刑部侍郎, Xingbu Shilang) as well as the director of salt and iron monopolies. It was said that Wang was talented at administration. Despite the heavy amount of administrative work that his positions entailed, he was able to analyze the issues quickly, and his subordinates who tried to deceive him were discovered quickly. With the realm not peaceful at the time, there were many criminal cases to be judged, and Wang collected the prior rulings and placed them near his seat. This allowed him to make rulings quickly. The speed at which he was able to carry out his task amazed his subordinates.

In 815, Wang was made the minister of rites (禮部尚書) and continued to serve as the director of the monopolies. He had requested another official who had served under Li Xun, Cheng Yi, to serve as his deputy director, due to Cheng's knowledge about money and goods. Subsequently, during Emperor Xianzong's campaign against the warlord Wu Yuanji, Cheng was sent out to the circuits to gather funds and was capable in doing so. After Huangfu Bo became powerful, he feared Wang as a rival, and therefore persuaded Emperor Xianzong that Cheng be made director of the monopolies, with Wang serving as the minister of rites only. In 818, Wang was made the military governor (jiedushi) of Xichuan Circuit (西川, headquartered in modern Chengdu, Sichuan) and the mayor of its capital Chengdu Municipality.

== During Emperor Muzong's reign ==
Emperor Xianzong died in 820 and was succeeded by his son Emperor Muzong. Huangfu Bo was immediately exiled. Wang Bo made a request to Emperor Muzong to allow him to return to Chang'an. The request was accompanied by a large tribute, and Wang further sent bribes to the powerful eunuchs, hoping to be made chancellor. The chancellor Duan Wenchang also spoke on his behalf. Emperor Muzong thus recalled Wang to Chang'an in 821. Another chancellor, Xiao Mian, objected vehemently, calling Wang "delicate and wicked" and arguing that the popular sentiment was against Wang's being made chancellor. When Emperor Muzong refused to listen, Xiao resigned his chancellorship. Emperor Muzong subsequently ordered Wang to return to Xichuan, but after Wang pleaded to remain, as Duan was also offering to resign, Duan was made the military governor of Xichuan. Wang, while not made chancellor, was kept at Chang'an to serve as the minister of justice (刑部尚書) and again as the director of the salt and iron monopolies. Wang subsequently proposed an increase in the tea tax, and Emperor Muzong, despite opposition from Li Jue, accepted Wang's proposal.

Later in the year, Wang was made Zhongshu Shilang (中書侍郎), the deputy head of the legislative bureau of government (中書省), and chancellor de facto with the title Tong Zhongshu Menxia Pingzhangshi (同中書門下平章事); he also remained as the director of salt and iron monopolies. It was said that while serving as chancellor, Wang was only interested in flattering the emperor and did not speak of important matters of state. In 822, however, when there was a crisis over how Liu Wu the military governor of Zhaoyi Circuit (昭義, headquartered in modern Changzhi, Shanxi) had detained one of Emperor Muzong's favorite eunuchs, Liu Chengjie (劉承偕), after he suspected Liu Chengjie of plotting to overthrow him. Wang joined the senior official Pei Du's proposal for Emperor Muzong to issue an edict exiling Liu Chengjie to induce Liu Wu to release Liu Chengjie. Liu Wu subsequently did so.

Meanwhile, Pei was set to be made the military governor of Huainan Circuit (淮南, headquartered in modern Yangzhou), but many advisorial officials suggested that Pei should not be sent out of the capital. Emperor Muzong himself respected Mu, and he kept Pei at Chang'an to serve as chancellor, while sending Wang to Huainan in Pei's stead. Wang also remained the director of salt and iron monopolies. It was said that when Wang arrived at Huainan, there was a famine caused by a severe drought, but Wang did not reduce tax burdens and continued to collect heavily from the people, leading to much popular resentment.

== During Emperor Jingzong's reign ==
After Emperor Muzong died in 824 and was succeeded by his son Emperor Jingzong, Wang Bo was relieved of his duties as director of salt and iron monopolies, but remained as the military governor of Huainan. He was also given the honorific title of Yinqing Guanglu Daifu (銀青光祿大夫) and made acting Sikong (司空, one of the Three Excellencies). At that time, the eunuch Wang Shoucheng was very powerful, and Wang Bo sent various treasures to Wang Shoucheng to ingratiate Wang Shoucheng. Wang Shoucheng thus recommended Wang Bo to Emperor Jingzong. When Emperor Jingzong brought this up at an imperial gathering, various advisorial officials, including Dugu Lang (獨孤朗), Zhang Zhongfang (張仲方), Kong Minxing (孔敏行), Liu Gongquan, Song Shenxi, Wei Renshi (韋仁實), Liu Dunru (劉敦儒), Li Jingrang (李景讓), and Xue Tinglao (薛廷老), argued that Wang Bo was evil. Despite all the opposition, however, Wang Bo was again made the director of salt and iron monopolies in 825. It was said that Wang Bo, once he was the director again, was interested in ingratiating the emperor by submitting "surpluses" even though the regular revenues were lacking. However, he was credited for dredging the canals within Huainan's capital Yang Prefecture to allow proper shipment of supplies. His successors were able to rely on the canals that he dredged.

== During Emperor Wenzong's reign ==
After Emperor Jingzong died in 826 and was succeeded by his brother Emperor Wenzong, Wang Bo was given the title of acting Situ (司徒, also one of the Three Excellencies). In 827, he went from Huainan to Chang'an to pay homage to Emperor Wenzong, and he submitted much tribute—including a large amount of silver vessels and silk—seeking to remain at Chang'an. Emperor Wenzong thereafter made him Zuo Pushe (左僕射), one of the heads of the executive bureau (尚書省), and Wang was made a chancellor again with the title Tong Zhongshu Menxia Pingzhangshi. He was also allowed to remain the director of the salt and iron monopolies. In 828, Wang was created the Duke of Taiyuan, and also made the director of Taiqing Palace (太清宮). In 830, he suffered a throat illness and died quickly. He was given posthumous honors.

The Old Book of Tang had these comments about Wang:

Wang Bo came from a poor family, and he became known based on his talent in writing and words. He was promoted and became prominent, and he was known for his abilities. However, he followed the flow of the political scene and no longer followed what was proper for officials. He became wicked and treacherous, and gentlemen were ashamed of him. However, he was diligent in administrative matters. As director of the monopolies, he had great responsibilities in filling positions of subordinates and ruling and reviewing on many records. Everyone else would have been unable to handle these matters, and Wang Bo was comfortable in doing so.

== Notes and references ==
- Old Book of Tang, vol. 164.
- New Book of Tang, vol. 167.
- Zizhi Tongjian, vols. 241, 242, 243.
