= Empress Dowager Wang (Jingzong) =

Empress dowager of Chinese Tang dynasty

Empress Dowager Wang (王太后, personal name unknown) (died February 22, 845), formally Empress Gongxi (恭僖皇后, "the respectful and careful empress"), known during her lifetime at times as Empress Dowager Baoli (寶曆太后) then as Empress Dowager Yi'an (義安太后), was an empress dowager of the Chinese Tang dynasty. She was the mother of Emperor Jingzong and a concubine of Emperor Muzong.

== Background ==
It is not known when the future Empress Dowager Wang was born, but it is known that her family was from Yue Prefecture (越州, in modern Shaoxing, Zhejiang). Her family was a family of officials, and her father Wang Shaoqing (王紹卿) served as a county magistrate.

== As princely and imperial consort ==
When the future Empress Dowager Wang was young, she entered the Crown Prince's palace and became a consort to then-imperial prince Li Heng, and she bore his oldest son Li Zhan in 809. After Li Heng became emperor in 820 (as Emperor Muzong), she was created an imperial consort rank — although the rank has been lost to history — but was not created empress. In 822, after Emperor Muzong suffered a stroke that rendered him unable to walk, Li Zhan was created crown prince, at the urging of the key officials Li Fengji and Pei Du.

== As empress dowager ==
In the spring of 824, Emperor Muzong died and was succeeded by Li Zhan (as Emperor JIngzong). Emperor Muzong's mother Empress Dowager Guo was honored grand empress dowager, while Consort Wang was honored empress dowager. In summer 824, when a disturbance led by two commoners, Su Xuanming (蘇玄明) and Zhang Shao (張韶), caused Emperor Jingzong to flee the palace briefly and flee to the Shence Army (神策軍) camps, he was concerned about the safety of the two empresses dowager and had the soldiers escort them to the Shence Army camps as well. Only after the disturbance was suppressed did he (and presumably they) return to the palace.

In 826, Emperor Jingzong was assassinated, purportedly by his polo players, led by Su Zuoming (蘇佐明). The eunuch Liu Keming (劉克明) initially supported Emperor Muzong's younger brother Li Wu the Prince of Jiàng to succeed Emperor Jingzong, but soon the eunuch army commanders Wang Shoucheng, Yang Chenghe (楊承和), Wei Congjian (魏從簡), and Liang Shouqian (梁守謙) killed Liu and Li Wu, supporting Emperor Jingzong's younger brother Li Han the Prince of Jiāng (note different tone) instead (as Emperor Wenzong). Emperor Wenzong honored his own mother Consort Xiao empress dowager and honored Empress Dowager Wang "Empress Dowager Baoli" ("Baoli" (寶曆) being Emperor Jingzong's era name). There were thus three empresses dowager in the palace at the time (along with Grand Empress Dowager Guo). It was said that Emperor Wenzong was filially pious and honored the three empresses dowager properly. Whenever he received valuable food items, he would first submit them to the ancestral temples, then the empresses dowager, before receiving them himself.

In 831, the chancellors suggested that there was a confusion between the titles of Grand Empress Dowager Guo and Empress Dowager Wang, and suggested that "Empress Dowager Baoli" was an inappropriate title. They pointed out that in the past, the empresses dowagers were referred to by the names of their palace, and suggested that Empress Dowager Wang be referred to as "Empress Dowager Yi'an" because she resided at Yi'an Hall (義安殿). Emperor Wenzong agreed. She died in 845, by which time another younger brother of Emperor Jingzong's, Emperor Wuzong, was emperor. She was buried in the eastern gardens at Emperor Muzong's tomb Guangling (光陵).

== Notes and references ==
- Old Book of Tang, vol. 52.
- New Book of Tang, vol. 77.
- Zizhi Tongjian, vols. 243, 248.
