= Zhu Yansi =

Zhu Yansi (朱延嗣) (died 826) was a general of the Chinese Tang dynasty, briefly ruling Lulong Circuit (盧龍, headquartered in modern Beijing) after his father Zhu Kerong's death.

It is not known when Zhu Yansi was born. His father Zhu Kerong, who had been an officer at Lulong Circuit had seized Lulong Circuit from the imperial government-commissioned military governor (Jiedushi) Zhang Hongjing in 821, after the Lulong soldiers mutinied against Zhang. Zhu Kerong later received an imperial commission, but effectively ruled Lulong independently from the imperial government. Zhu Yansi was Zhu Kerong's second son.

In 826, Zhu Kerong and his oldest son Zhu Yanling (朱延齡) were killed in a mutiny. Another faction of the soldiers supported Zhu Yansi to succeed Zhu Kerong. Zhu Yansi assumed the title of acting military governor. It was said that Zhu Yansi was cruel as a ruler. Less than four months later, the officer Li Zaiyi led another mutiny and killed Zhu Yansi, and further slaughtering his family. Li submitted a report to the imperial government accusing Zhu Yansi of crimes. The imperial government subsequently commissioned Li as the new military governor.

== Notes and references ==
- Old Book of Tang, vol. 180.
- New Book of Tang, vol. 212.
- Zizhi Tongjian, vol. 243.
