= Emperor Muzong of Tang =

Emperor of Tang China from 820 to 824

Emperor Muzong of Tang 唐穆宗
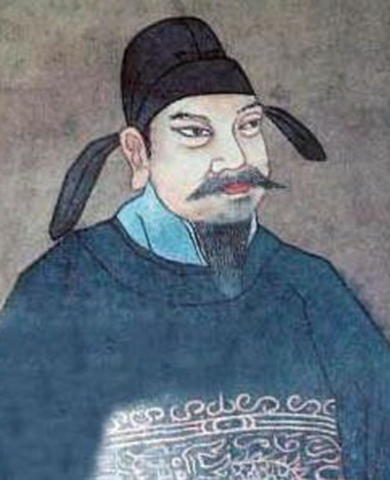

Emperor of the Tang dynasty
- Reign: February 20, 820 – February 25, 824
- Predecessor: Emperor Xianzong
- Successor: Emperor Jingzong
- Born: 26 July 795
- Died: 25 February 824 (aged 28)
- Burial: Guang Mausoleum (光陵)
- Consorts: Empress Gongxi (m. –824); Empress Zhenxian (m. –824); Empress Xuanyi
- Issue: Emperor Jingzong; Emperor Wenzong; Li Cou; Li Rong; Emperor Wuzong; Princess Yifeng; Princess Huaiyang; Princess Yan'an; Princess Jintang; Princess Qingyuan; Princess Raoyang; Princess Yichang; Princess Ankang
Full name
- Family name: Lǐ (李); Given name: Originally Yòu (宥), later Héng (恆) (changed 812)
Era name and dates
- Chángqìng (長慶): February 9, 821 – January 29, 825
Posthumous name
- Emperor Ruisheng Wenhui Xiao (睿聖文惠孝皇帝) (full)
Temple name
- Mùzōng (穆宗)
- House: Li
- Dynasty: Tang
- Father: Emperor Xianzong
- Mother: Empress Yi'an

Tang Muzong
- Chinese: 唐穆宗
- Literal meaning: "Solemn Ancestor of the Tang"
Transcriptions
Standard Mandarin
- Hanyu Pinyin: Táng Mùzōng

Li Heng
- Chinese: 李恆
- Literal meaning: (personal name)
Transcriptions
Standard Mandarin
- Hanyu Pinyin: Lǐ Héng

Emperor Muzong of Tang (July 26, 795 – February 25, 824), personal name Li Heng, né Li You (李宥) (name changed 812), was the 15th emperor of the Tang dynasty of China. He reigned from 820 to 824. Emperor Muzong was the son of Emperor Xianzong. He was created crown prince in 812 during the reign of Emperor Xianzong and, after Emperor Xianzong was allegedly assassinated by a eunuch, Li Heng was proclaimed emperor in 820.

After succeeding to the throne, Muzong spent his time feasting and heavily drinking, thereby neglecting his duties as emperor. Meanwhile, the temporarily subdued regional military governors (jiedushi) began to challenge the central Tang government, leading to the new de facto independence of three circuits north of the Yellow River, which Emperor Xianzong had subdued. Internally, corruption was rife.

Emperor Muzong's brief reign came to an end in 824, and was viewed as the start of the downward spiral of the Tang dynasty.

== Background ==
Li You was born in 795, during the reign of his great-grandfather Emperor Dezong. At that time, his father Li Chun was the Prince of Guangling, and his grandfather Li Song was Emperor Dezong's crown prince. Li You's mother Princess Guo was Li Chun's wife and a granddaughter of the prominent general Guo Ziyi—her parents were Guo Ziyi's son Guo Ai (郭曖) and Princess Shenping, a sister to Emperor Dezong. Li You was Li Chun's third son. At some point, Li You was created the Prince of Jian'an.

In 806, by which time Li Chun was emperor (as Emperor Xianzong), Li You was created the Prince of Sui. His mother Princess Guo, however, despite her having been Li Chun's wife, was not created empress, but only an imperial consort, albeit with the high rank of Guifei (貴妃). (During the remainder of his reign, Emperor Xianzong would repeatedly resisted calls by imperial officials to have Consort Guo made empress, using one excuse after another, fearing that if she, with her honored heritage, were made empress, she would so dominate the palace that no other imperial consort would dare approach him.) Further, although Li You, as the son of Consort Guo, was considered by the imperial officials as the proper heir, when the imperial scholars, led by Li Jiang, requested that Emperor Xianzong create a crown prince in 809, Emperor Xianzong did not create Li You crown prince, and instead created Li You's older brother Li Ning (by Consort Ji) crown prince. Li Ning died in 811, and in 812, Emperor Xianzong created Li You crown prince and changed his name to Li Heng. (When Emperor Xianzong ordered the imperial scholar Cui Qun to draft a petition in the name of Li You's older brother Li Kuan the Prince of Li offering to yield the position, Cui declined, pointing out that Li Heng, as the son of a wife, should have had priority over Li Kuan in any event, and Emperor Xianzong agreed.)

== As crown prince ==
Not much was recorded about Li Heng's life as crown prince, although it is known that in 817, the imperial consultant Wei Shou (韋綬), who was an attendant to Li Heng in his studies, drew disfavor from Emperor Xianzong for providing Li Heng with expensive food and pleasing him with humor. Emperor Xianzong removed Wei from his post as attendant, and soon sent him out of the capital Chang'an to serve as the prefect of Qian Prefecture (虔州, in modern Ganzhou, Jiangxi). Meanwhile, the powerful eunuch Tutu Chengcui had often urged Emperor Xianzong to replace Li Heng with Li Kuan (whose name had been changed to Li Yun by this point). Tutu, however, did not relent in his hopes to have Li Yun made crown prince, even by 820, when Emperor Xianzong had become seriously ill. Li Heng, worried about what would happen next, requested advice from his uncle (Consort Guo's brother) Guo Zhao (郭釗), who advised him to simply serve his father with filial piety and not worry about the rest.

By this point, Emperor Xianzong, whose illness was said to be due to alchemists' pills that were designed to achieve immortality. Xianzong's temper and rage had become uncontrolled, causing widespread fear among the eunuchs. In spring 820, he died suddenly—and it was believed that he was assassinated by the eunuch Chen Hongzhi (陳弘志), but the eunuch suppressed an investigation into the matter, announcing that Emperor Xianzong had died from the pills' complications. In the aftermaths, the eunuchs Liang Shouqian (梁守謙), Ma Jintan (馬進潭), Liu Chengjie (劉承偕), Wei Yuansu (韋元素), and Wang Shoucheng, who supported Li Heng, killed Tutu and Li Yun, allowing Li Heng to take the throne (as Emperor Muzong). (There were suspicions by some, including by Li Heng's younger brother Li Yi, who would later become Emperor Xuānzong, that Li Heng and his mother Consort Guo were involved in Emperor Xianzong's assassination.)

== Reign ==
=== Loss of Chengde, Lulong, and Weibo Circuits ===
As soon as Emperor Muzong took the throne, he put to death the alchemists who had been supplying Emperor Xianzong with the immortality pills. He further quickly exiled the chancellors Huangfu Bo and Linghu Chu, replacing them with new chancellors. He also honored his mother Consort Guo as empress dowager and was extravagant in supplies to her. He himself was spending much time in games and hunts, against the advice of those officials who found such activities inappropriate, but was said to be tolerant toward those giving such advice.

At the time that Emperor Muzong took the throne, he inherited a state that had just recently been, during his father's reign (which was known as the Yuanhe Restoration (元和中興), due to Emperor Xianzong's era name's being Yuanhe), restored to unity under the imperial government after various circuits, the most defiant of which were Pinglu (平盧, headquartered in modern Tai'an, Shandong), Weibo (魏博, headquartered in modern Handan, Hebei), Chengde (成德, headquartered in modern Shijiazhuang, Hebei), and Lulong (盧龍, headquartered in modern Beijing), had been effectively independent from the imperial government. As of 819, when Emperor Xianzong's forces crushed those of Li Shidao, the military governor of Pinglu, in effect, these circuits that had broken away from the imperial government since the end of the Anshi Rebellion had resubmitted to the imperial government.

In winter 820, major events that tested Emperor Muzong's abilities to keep these circuits under control came. Wang Chengzong the military governor of Chengde, whose family had controlled Chengde since his grandfather Wang Wujun and whose forces Emperor Xianzong was unable to defeat (although Wang Chengzong himself eventually became apprehensive of Emperor Xianzong's might and submitted anyway), died. With Wang Chengzong having sent his sons Wang Zhigan (王知感) and Wang Zhixin (王知信) to Chang'an to serve as hostages in order to show his submission to the imperial government, his subordinates, who wanted to keep Chengde independent from the imperial government, supported Wang Chengzong's brother Wang Chengyuan to succeed him. Wang Chengyuan pretended to accept their support, but declared his loyalty to the imperial government and secretly petitioned Emperor Muzong to replace him.

Emperor Muzong reacted by, against the advice of the general Yang Yuanqing (楊元卿), moving Tian Hongzheng the military governor of Weibo—whose submission to the imperial government in 812 had been a crucial step in the Yuanhe Restoration and who had been a major participant in the subsequent campaigns against Chengde and Pinglu—to Chengde, Wang Chengyuan to Yicheng Circuit (義成, headquartered in modern Anyang, Henan), Liu Wu from Yicheng to Zhaoyi Circuit (昭義, headquartered in modern Changzhi, Shanxi), Li Su from Wuning Circuit (武寧, headquartered in modern Xuzhou, Jiangsu) to Weibo, and made Tian Hongzheng's son Tian Bu the military governor of Heyang Circuit (河陽, headquartered in modern Jiaozuo, Henan). Wang Chengyuan, despite the opposition of his soldiers, departed Chengde and turned control of the circuit over to Tian Hongzheng. Tian Hongzheng, however, was apprehensive that the soldiers under him—whom he had fought on the battlefield for years and many of whom bore hatred for him—would mutiny, and thus brought 2,000 Weibo soldiers to Chengde to serve as his personal guard. When he requested that the imperial government supply the salaries of these Weibo soldiers, however, the acting director of finances, Cui Ling (崔倰), a relative of the chancellor Cui Zhi, not understanding the seriousness of the situation, believed that it was the Chengde soldiers' responsibility to protect their military governor, refused. Tian was forced to return the Weibo soldiers to Weibo.

Meanwhile, in spring 821, Liu Zong the military governor of Lulong, who had taken power initially by killing his father Liu Ji and brother Liu Gun (劉緄), had grown fearful of his father's and brother's spirits, and wished to resign and become a Buddhist monk. He also requested an award to the soldiers, while ordering a number of officers that he felt were difficult to control, including Zhu Kerong (the grandson of a former military governor, Zhu Tao) to report to Chang'an, hoping that the imperial government would give them proper discipline and rewards such that they would become faithful to the imperial government. He further recommended that Lulong be divided into three circuits and recommended Zhang Hongjing, Xue Ping, and Lu Shimei (盧士玫) to take over the three circuits. Specifically, his division plan called for the circuit capital, You Prefecture (幽州), along with Zhuo Prefecture (涿州, in modern Baoding, Hebei), be given to Zhang; Ji (薊州, in modern Tianjin), Gui (媯州, in modern Zhangjiakou, Hebei), and Tan (檀州, in modern Beijing) Prefectures be given to Xue; and Ying (瀛州) and Mo (莫州, both in modern Cangzhou, Hebei) Prefectures be given to Lu. (Liu had made these recommendations on the bases that when Zhang ruled Hedong, which neighbored Lulong, Liu had often heard good opinions of Zhang's governance; that Xue was the son of Xue Song and familiar with the region; and that Lu was a relative of Liu's wife's.)

Emperor Muzong accepted Liu's submission, but did not fully implement Liu's partition plan; Ying and Mo were given to Lu Shimei, but the remaining prefectures were all given to Zhang, under the suggestion of the chancellors Cui Zhi and Du Yuanying, who did not understand the rationale of Liu's plan. Further, Zhu and the other officers that Liu sent to Chang'an were not given offices or salaries, and it was said that as they lacked income, they fell into financial desperation, even requiring loans for their food and clothing, despite their frequent submission of requests for offices to Cui and Du. When Zhang arrived at Lulong, he ordered Zhu and the others to return to Lulong, further angering them. Meanwhile, Zhang further drew the anger of the people and soldiers of Lulong over a number of actions:

- In contrast to the past military governors' willingness to bear the difficulties with the people, including the weather conditions, when Zhang was arriving at You Prefecture, he was in a litter borne by eight men, shocking the people of You Prefecture.
- Zhang Hongjing was solemn and arrogant, not willing to speak with the people, and he rarely accepted advice from guests and the army officers.
- He gave much authority to his assistants Wei Yong (韋雍) and Zhang Zonghou (張宗厚), and these assistants were disrespectful of soldiers and extravagant in their living—such that, shocking to the people of You Prefecture, they were often feasting deep into the night and going home after midnight, with their guards loudly escorting them.
- When Liu submitted to imperial authority, Emperor Muzong ordered a large cash reward for the Lulong soldiers, but Zhang Hongjing took 20% of the award for headquarter expenses.
- The people of You Prefecture had venerated the leading figures of the Anshi Rebellion, An Lushan and Shi Siming, and referred to them as the "Two Holy Men." Zhang Hongjing, wanting to change this custom, had An and Shi exhumed and their caskets destroyed, causing resentment among the people.

In fall 821, when a low-level officer accidentally collided with Wei's guards, Wei ordered the officer whipped, but the other officers were unaccustomed to this kind of punishment and refused to carry out the punishment. Zhang Hongjing had the officers arrested. That night, the soldiers mutinied, killed Wei and several other staff member of Zhang's, and put Zhang under arrest. The next day, the mutineers began to regret their actions, but when they met Zhang to ask for forgiveness, Zhang did not speak at all. The mutineers believed that Zhang was not intending to pardon them, and instead supported Zhu Kerong's father Zhu Hui (朱洄) to serve as the acting military governor. Zhu Hui declined, but recommended Zhu Kerong, and the soldiers agreed.

Meanwhile, in fall 821, after the Weibo soldiers had departed from Chengde, the Chengde officer Wang Tingcou plotted a mutiny. One night, he led his soldiers and attacked Tian Hongzheng's headquarters, killing him, his staff, and their family members, and then taking over control of most of Chengde by killing those who disagreed with him. Niu Yuanyi (牛元翼), the prefect of one of Chengde's prefectures, Shen Prefecture (深州, in modern Hengshui, Hebei), tried to resist Wang Tingcou, but soon was besieged within the capital of Shen Prefecture. Meanwhile, Li Su planned a campaign against Wang and Zhu, but fell ill, and was replaced by Tian Bu as the military governor of Weibo. Emperor Muzong commissioned Pei Du, a key chancellor during Emperor Xianzong's reign, to oversee the entire operation against Lulong and Chengde, which also included such renowned imperial generals as Wu Chongyin and Li Guangyan and had some 150,000 soldiers in total, against the less than 10,000 soldiers that the rebels had.

However, by this point, the imperial treasury had been exhausted by Emperor Muzong's extravagance, and Pei's battle plans were being interfered with by Emperor Muzong's trusted imperial scholar Yuan Zhen. The imperial forces were unable to achieve quick victory over Chengde and Lulong rebels, and when Tian Bu tried to advance his forces, they took mutinied under the leadership of Shi Xiancheng. Tian tried to rally the remaining troops, which refused to follow his orders further. He committed suicide, and Shi, who nominally submitted to the imperial government and thus received imperial sanction, took over Weibo. The imperial government was forced to capitulate, and soon also named Zhu and Wang military governors of their circuits as well, ending the campaign against them. From this point on, until the eventual fall of the Tang dynasty altogether in 907, the imperial government was never again able to assert direct control over Chengde, Lulong, or Weibo.

=== Aftermath ===
After the end of the campaign against Lulong and Chengde rebels, Pei Du was recalled to Chang'an to serve as chancellor. Soon thereafter, there were allegations that Yuan Zhen (who had been made chancellor by this point as well) had plotted to assassinate Pei. Investigations did not yield positive evidence for the allegations, but as a result, both Pei and Yuan were removed from the chancellor posts.

Meanwhile, in fall 822, soldiers of Xuanwu Circuit (宣武, headquartered in modern Kaifeng, Henan)—traditionally under imperial control, rather than the situation with Lulong, Chengde, and Weibo—mutinied against the military governor Li Yuan (李愿), killing Li Yuan's wife and forcing him to flee. The chancellor Du Yuanying and the official Zhang Pingshu (張平叔) advocated placating the mutineers' leader Li Jie (李㝏) by making him military governor, but the chancellor Li Fengji opposed, arguing that effectively abandoning control over Xuanwu would lead to the eventual loss of the Yangtze River-Huai River region. With the prefects of the three Xuanwu prefectures other than the capital prefecture Bian Prefecture (汴州) all petitioning for a new military governor rather than Li Jie, however, Emperor Muzong decided to act against Li Jie by making Han Chong (韓充), the brother of former long-time Xuanwu military governor Han Hong, military governor, and have him head toward Xuanwu, while commissioning Li Jie as a general of the imperial guards. Li Jie refused the commission and put one of the resistant prefectures, Song Prefecture (宋州, in modern Shangqiu, Henan), and its prefect Gao Chengjian (高承簡), under siege. However, Han, Li Guangyan (then the military governor of neighboring Zhongwu Circuit (忠武, headquartered in modern Xuchang, Henan), Cao Hua the military governor of Yanhai Circuit (兗海, headquartered in modern Ji'ning, Shandong), and Wang Zhixing the military governor of Wuning Circuit, quickly converged on Xuanwu. Li Jie, who had fallen ill by that point, was killed by his own subordinate Li Zhi (李質), who surrendered to Han.

Around the new year 823, when Emperor Muzong was participating in a polo game in the palace, a eunuch fell off his horse. Emperor Muzong, shocked by the incident, suffered a stroke and was unable to walk. For days, no official was able to meet with Emperor Muzong. At the repeated requests of Pei and Li Fengji, Emperor Muzong was taken to an imperial hall to meet with the officials to calm the people's hearts, and at their further urging, he created his oldest son Li Zhan the Prince of Jing, crown prince. It was said that shortly thereafter, Emperor Muzong recovered somewhat from his stroke.

In 823, impressed with the official Niu Sengru for having refused gifts from the now-deceased Han Hong while virtually the rest of the entire imperial administration had received Han's gifts, Emperor Muzong made Niu chancellor, disappointing that similarly highly regarded governor of Zhexi Circuit (浙西, headquartered in modern Zhenjiang, Jiangsu), Li Deyu. Li Deyu, in disappointment, suspected Li Fengji of acting in concert with Niu to reject him, and resented Niu and Li Fengji deeply. (This incident is considered one of the precipitating incidents for the so-called Niu-Li Factional Struggles, which would last decades.) Meanwhile, Li Fengji, who had a close alliance with Wang Shoucheng, and his associates were able to have Pei, whom Li Fengji viewed as an enemy, sent out of the capital to serve as military governor of Shannan West Circuit (山南西道, headquartered in modern Hanzhong, Shaanxi), and Emperor Muzong's trusted imperial scholar Li Shen, ejected from the palace.

In spring 824, Emperor Muzong's old illness recurred, and he died shortly after. Li Zhan succeeded him (as Emperor Jingzong).

== Chancellors during reign ==
- Huangfu Bo (820)
- Linghu Chu (820)
- Han Hong (820)
- Xiao Mian (820–821)
- Duan Wenchang (820–821)
- Cui Zhi (820–822)
- Du Yuanying (821–823)
- Wang Bo (821–822)
- Yuan Zhen (822)
- Pei Du (822)
- Li Fengji (822–824)
- Niu Sengru (823–824)

== Family ==
- Empress Gongxi, of the Wang clan (恭僖皇后 王氏; d. 845)
  - Li Zhan, Jingzong (敬宗 李湛; 809–827), first son
- Empress Zhenxian, of the Xiao clan (貞獻皇后 蕭氏; d. 847)
  - Li Ang, Wenzong (文宗 李昂; 809–840), second son
- Empress Xuanyi, of the Wei clan (宣懿皇后 韋氏)
  - Li Yan, Wuzong (武宗 李炎; 814–846), ninth son
- Noble Consort, of the Wu clan (貴妃 武氏)
  - Princess Yifeng (義豐公主)
    - Married Wei Churen of Jingzhao (京兆 韋處仁), and had issue (one son)
- Worthy Consort, of the Yang clan of Hongnong (賢妃 弘農楊氏)
  - Li Rong, Prince An (安王 李溶; 812–840), eighth son
- First Imperial Concubine, of the Zhang clan (昭儀 張氏)
  - Princess Huaiyang (淮陽公主)
    - Married Liu Zhengyuan of Hedong (河東 柳正元)
- Talented Lady, of the Zheng clan (才人 鄭氏)
  - Princess Jintang (金堂公主; 812–875), fourth daughter
    - Married Guo Zhonggong of Huayin (華陰 郭仲恭) in 838, and had issue (two sons, three daughters)
- Unknown
  - Li Cou, Crown Prince Huaiyi (懷懿皇太子 李湊; d. 835), sixth son
  - Princess Yan'an (延安公主)
    - Married Dou Huan, Duke Qishan (竇浣)
  - Princess Qingyuan (清源公主)
  - Princess Raoyang (饒陽公主)
    - Married Guo Zhongci of Huayin, Duke Taiyuan (華陰 郭仲詞)
  - Princess Yichang (義昌公主)
  - Princess Ankang (安康公主)

== See also ==
- Heng Prefecture, renamed during Muzong's reign to avoid naming taboo

Regnal titles
Preceded by Emperor Xianzong of Tang	Emperor of Tang China; 820–824	Succeeded by Emperor Jingzong of Tang
