= Li Fengji =

Li Fengji (Chinese: 李逢吉; 758 – February 27, 835), courtesy name Xuzhou (虛舟), formally Duke Cheng of Zheng (鄭成公) or Duke Cheng of Liang (涼成公), was an official of the Chinese Tang dynasty, serving as a chancellor during the reigns of Emperor Xianzong, Emperor Xianzong's son Emperor Muzong, and grandson Emperor Jingzong. He was portrayed by traditional accounts as full of machinations against his political opponents.

== Background ==
Li Fengji was born in 758, during the reign of Emperor Suzong. His family was part of the Li clan of Longxi—which was descended from Li Gao the founder of the Western Liang state during the Sixteen Kingdoms period, as the Tang dynasty imperial clan was but considered distant enough from the imperial lineage that he was not considered part of the imperial clan. After Li Gao, Li Fengji's family traced its ancestry to a line of officials of Jin dynasty (266–420), Northern Wei, Northern Qi, Sui dynasty, and Tang, although Li Fengji's grandfather Li Yan (李顏) and father Li Guiqi (李歸期) were both listed without offices.

As Li Yan was chronically ill and Li Fengji tended to him, Li Fengji studied the medical books of the time and became knowledgeable in medicine. After Li Fengji passed the imperial examinations, the general Fan Xichao (范希朝) invited him to serve as a scribe on his staff when Fan served as the military governor (jiedushi) of Zhenwu Circuit (振武, headquartered in modern Hohhot, Inner Mongolia). Fan subsequently recommended Li Fengji to then-reigning Emperor Dezong (Emperor Suzong's grandson), and Li Fengji was made a Zuo Shiyi (左拾遺), a low-level consultant at the examination bureau of government (門下省, Menxia Sheng). He was later promoted to Zuo Bujue (左補闕), also consultant at the examination bureau, and then made an imperial censor with the title Shiyushi (侍御史). He later served as the deputy emissary on a mission to Tufan.

== During Emperor Xianzong's reign ==
In 808, by which time Emperor Dezong's grandson Emperor Xianzong was emperor, Li Fengji served as the deputy to Duan Pingzhong (段平仲) on a diplomatic mission to Nanzhao. After Li Fengji returned from the mission in 809, he was made Cibu Langzhong (祠部郎中), a supervisorial official at the ministry of rites (禮部, Libu), and later Yousi Langzhong (右司郎中), a supervisorial official under the secretaries general of the executive bureau (尚書省, Shangshu Sheng). In 811, he was made an imperial attendant (給事中, Jishizhong). In 812, he was made an attendant scholar to the studies of the crown prince Li Heng and other imperial princes, along with Li Ju (李巨). In 814, he was made Zhongshu Sheren (中書舍人), a mid-level official at the legislative bureau (中書省, Zhongshu Sheng). In 816, he was put in charge of the imperial examinations for that year. Later that year, he was made Menxia Shilang (門下侍郎), the deputy head of the examination bureau, and de facto chancellor with the title Tong Zhongshu Menxia Pingzhangshi (同中書門下平章事); he was also given the honorary title of Chaoyi Daifu (朝議大夫). According to the Old Book of Tang, Li Fengji was treacherous and used his machination to harm others.

In 817, by which time Emperor Xianzong was waging two simultaneous campaigns against warlords—Wang Chengzong, who controlled Chengde Circuit (成德, headquartered in modern Shijiazhuang, Hebei), and Wu Yuanji, who controlled Zhangyi Circuit (彰義, headquartered in modern Zhumadian, Henan)—Li Fengji advocated ending the campaign against Chengde and concentrating on the campaign against Zhangyi. Emperor Xianzong agreed, and ordered the troops then attacking Chengde to withdraw back to their own circuits. Later in the year, Li Fengji further advocated ending the campaign against Zhangyi as well, but Emperor Xianzong accepted the advice of Li Fengji's fellow chancellor Pei Du and further, as Pei volunteered, sent Pei to the front to oversee the campaign. Pei was concerned that Li Fengji and the imperial scholar Linghu Chu would work together to interfere the campaign, and therefore accused Linghu of using inappropriate language on the edict for Pei's commission and had Linghu demoted. Later in the year, both because of Li Fengji's disagreements with Pei, whom Emperor Xianzong trusted, and because Emperor Xianzong wanted to commission an associate of his while he was still an imperial prince, Zhang Su (張宿), as a high-level consultant and Li Fengji strenuously objected, Emperor Xianzong sent Li Fengji out of the capital Chang'an, making him the military governor of Dongchuan Circuit (東川, headquartered in modern Mianyang, Sichuan.

== During Emperor Muzong's reign ==
After Emperor Xianzong died in 820 and was succeeded by Li Heng (as Emperor Muzong), Li Fengji was moved to be the military governor of Shannan East Circuit (山南東道, headquartered in modern Xiangfan, Hubei) as well as the prefect of its capital Xiang Prefecture (襄州). As he had previously attended to Emperor Muzong's studies, he sent messengers to plead with Emperor Muzong's close associates, requesting to be recalled. In 822, he was recalled serving as minister of defense (兵部尚書, Bingbu Shangshu). At that time, Pei and Yuan Zhen were serving as chancellors, despite Pei's having previously severely criticized Yuan. It was said that Li Fengji believed that Pei and Yuan would turn against each other, and therefore had it reported that Yuan had conspired with the official Yu Fang (于方) to assassinate Pei. After Yu was arrested and interrogated, no positive evidence of such a conspiracy was found, but both Pei and Yuan were removed from their chancellor positions, and Li Fengji was again made Menxia Shilang and chancellor.

Later in the year, when mutineer soldiers at Xuanwu Circuit (宣武, headquartered in modern Kaifeng, Henan) expelled the military governor Li Yuan (李愿) and supported the officer Li Jie (李㝏), Li Fengji advocated sending a replacement for Li Yuan and, if Li Jie did not accept the replacement, then attacking Xuanwu, pointing out that while the imperial government had been forced to allow certain circuits north of the Yellow River to decide on their own military governors, allowing Xuanwu to do so would cause the gradual erosion of the imperial control over the Yangtze River-Huai River region, while Du Yuanying and Zhang Pingshu (張平叔) advocated commissioning Li Jie to avoid a war. Emperor Muzong initially could not decide, but soon thereafter, when the prefects of three of Xuanwu's prefectures, Song (宋州, in modern Shangqiu, Henan), Bo (亳州, in modern Bozhou, Anhui), and Ying (潁州, in modern Fuyang, Anhui), requested that a new military governor be sent, Emperor Muzong came to believe that Li Fengji was correct. Li Fengji thus suggested summoning Li Jie to serve as an imperial guard general, while transferring Han Chong (韓充) the military governor of Yicheng Circuit (義成, headquartered in modern Anyang, Henan), whose brother Han Hong had served as Xuanwu's military governor for a long period, to Xuanwu. Li Jie resisted the orders but was soon killed by his own subordinate Li Zhi (李質), who surrendered the circuit to Han Chong.

Late in the year, after Emperor Muzong suffered a stroke after being shocked by the fall of an eunuch at a polo game, it was at Li Fengji's and Pei's request that Emperor Muzong created his oldest son Li Zhan the Prince of Jing as crown prince.

In 823, after Emperor Muzong made Niu Sengru a chancellor, over Li Deyu, who also wanted to be chancellor, Li Deyu believed that it was at Li Fengji's recommendation that Niu was made chancellor over him, and therefore resented both Niu and Li Fengji. (The Song dynasty historian Sima Guang, the author of the Zizhi Tongjian, believed that it was because of this resentment that Li Deyu later had his associate Li Yirang (李夷讓), write defamatory remarks about Li Fengji and Li Fengji's associates in the imperial chronicles, which were then adopted into the Old Book of Tang.)

It was said because Li Fengji disliked Pei, Li Fengji's associates, including Zhang Youxin (張又新), frequently attacked Pei, such that also in 823, Pei was sent out of the capital to serve as the military governor of Shannan West Circuit (山南西道). Customarily, when former chancellors were sent out to a circuit to serve as a military governor, he would be given an honorary chancellor title to carry, but because of Li Fengji's dislike of Pei, Pei was not given such a title.

Meanwhile, it was said that Li Fengji closely associated with the powerful chancellor Wang Shoucheng (王守澄). The imperial scholar Li Shen (李紳), whom Emperor Muzong trusted as an advisor, often opposed Li Fengji's and Wang's proposals. Li Fengji thus decided to try to remove Li Shen. At that time, it happened that there was no deputy chief imperial censor, so Li Fengji recommended Li Shen for the post. Per regulations at the time, when the mayor of Jingzhao Municipality (京兆, i.e., the Chang'an region) were commissioned, he were to report to the office of the imperial censors to pay homage. At that time, however, Han Yu was both mayor and chief imperial censor. Li Fengji issued an order exempting Han from the homage visit as he was also chief imperial censor, believing that soon Li Shen and Han would engage in a dispute over this matter, and indeed, the two of them did. Li Fengji thus reported to Emperor Muzong that the two were unable to work together. As a result, Emperor Muzong was initially set to send Li Shen out of the capital to serve as governor of Jiangxi Circuit (江西, headquartered in modern Nanchang, Jiangxi), until he had the chance to personally hear from Li Shen and Han to realize the reasons for their dispute, and therefore kept Li Shen at the capital to serve as deputy minister of census.

== During Emperor Jingzong's reign ==
In spring 824, Emperor Muzong died and was succeeded by Li Zhan (as Emperor Jingzong). Before Emperor Jingzong formally took the throne, Li Fengji served as regent for three days. After Emperor Jingzong took the throne, he had his associates accuse Li Shen and Du Yuanying of having supported Emperor Muzong's brother Li Cong (李悰) the Prince of Shen as Emperor Muzong's successor. Emperor Jingzong, believing Li Fengji's associates, exiled Li Shen to be the military advisor to the prefect of Duan Prefecture (端州, in modern Zhaoqing, Guangdong), and further agreed to eventually put Li Shen to death. Only after the imperial scholar Wei Chuhou submitted a petition defending Li Shen and Emperor Jingzong himself discovered a prior petition by Li Shen supporting him as crown prince did Emperor Jingzong stop further actions against Li Shen. It was said that by this point, Li Fengji's close associates included Zhang Youxin, Li Zhongyan, Li Xuzhi (李續之), Li Yu (李虞), Liu Qichu (劉栖楚), Jiang Qia (姜洽), Zhang Quanyu (張權輿), and Cheng Xifan (程昔範). Many people who wanted greater offices flattered these associates of Li Fengji's, and the people who resented Li Fengji at the time referred to these eight associates as the "eight passes" (八關, Ba Guan) (i.e., without going through them, one could not meet Li Fengji). It was at this time that Li Fengji was created the Duke of Liang. In summer 824, per Li Fengji's recommendations, Li Cheng was also made chancellor, along with Dou Yizhi.

In 825, during an incident where the county magistrate Cui Fa (崔發), after eunuchs had attacked commoners, arrested the eunuchs involved, Emperor Jingzong had Cui arrested and battered. Despite a subsequent general pardon that pardoned all prisoners, Cui remained held after the pardon. Only after Li Fengji interceded on Cui's behalf, pointing out that Cui's mother was nearly 80 years old and had gotten ill over Cui's imprisonment, was Cui released.

Li Fengji continued to resent Li Shen, and after Emperor Jingzong issued another general pardon in summer 825, initially, the edict that Li Fengji drafted allows exiled officials who had previously moved toward the capital be allowed to be moved again—but intentionally failed to mention officials who had not previously been moved, to prevent Li Shen from being moved. When Wei pointed this out, Emperor Jingzong revised the edict to allow such movements, and Li Shen thus was moved closer to the capital to serve as the secretary general of Jiang Prefecture (江州, in modern Jiujiang, Jiangxi).

By fall 825, Li Fengji and Li Cheng had grown to dislike each other. Meanwhile, Li Cheng's relative Li Rengshu (李仍叔) had informed the official Wu Zhao (武昭), who had been stuck in an undesirable position—serving as the secretary general of Emperor Jingzong's granduncle Li Shen (李紳—not the same person as the official that Li Fengji resented) the Prince of Yuan—that Li Cheng had wanted to give him a better position, but Li Fengji blocked the move. Wu thus resented Li Fengji, and one day, after he got drunk, he told his friend Mao Hui (茅彙) that he wished to kill Li Fengji. This remark was overheard and reported. Li Fengji's associate Li Zhongyan tried to induce Mao into implicating Li Cheng. Mao refused. In the subsequent investigation, Li Zhongyan's attempt to induce Mao to bear false testimony was revealed. As a result of the investigations, Wu was executed by caning, Li Rengshu was demoted, and Mao and Li Zhongyan were both exiled.

Meanwhile, around the same time, Liu Wu the military governor of Zhaoyi Circuit (昭義, headquartered in modern Changzhi, Shanxi), had died, and his will recommended his son Liu Congjian to succeed him. Despite the senior official Li Jiang's advice that Liu Wu's request be rejected, Li Fengji and Wang Shoucheng decided that Liu Wu's request should be granted. As a result, Emperor Jingzong commissioned Liu Congjian as the acting military governor and eventually the military governor of Zhaoyi.

Meanwhile, in spring 826, Emperor Jingzong recalled Pei Du to the capital to be chancellor again, despite Li Fengji's associates' various attempts to attack Pei, including intimations that Pei had been prophesied to be emperor and had treasonous ambitions. In winter 826, Li Fengji was sent out of the capital to again serve as the military governor of Shannan East Circuit, carrying an honorary chancellor title. He invited Li Xu to be his deputy and Zhang Youxin to be his military commander. However, it was soon discovered that Li Fengji had previously hidden a fugitive, Tian Pi (田伾). As a result, Li Fengji was punished by being stripped of three months' salary, while both Li Xu and Zhang were demoted.

== During Emperor Wenzong's reign ==
In 828, by which time Emperor Jingzong's brother Emperor Wenzong was emperor, Li Fengji was made the military governor of Xuanwu Circuit and prefect of its capital Bian Prefecture (汴州). In 831, he was made the defender of the eastern capital Luoyang and given honorary titles as senior advisor to the Crown Prince and Kaifu Yitong Sansi (開府儀同三司). In 834, by which time Li Zhongyan (whose name had been changed to Li Xun by that point) was in power, Li Fengji was recalled to Chang'an to serve as Zuo Pushe (左僕射), one of the heads of the executive bureau, as well as acting Situ (司徒, one of the Three Excellencies). However, as he was old and ill at the time, he was never able to meet the emperor, and he retired as Situ. He died in 835 and was given posthumous honors.

== Notes and references ==
- Old Book of Tang, vol. 167.
- New Book of Tang, vol. 174.
- Zizhi Tongjian, vols. 239, 240, 242, 243, 245
