= Huangfu Bo =

Chinese Tang dynasty politician (died 820)

Huangfu Bo (皇甫鎛; died 820) was a Chinese economist and politician. He served as an official of the Chinese Tang dynasty, serving as a chancellor during the reign of Emperor Xianzong. He was viewed by traditional historians as a wicked official who pleased Emperor Xianzong by submitting revenues for Emperor Xianzong's personal use and who used machinations to expel his colleagues Pei Du and Cui Qun from the imperial government.

== Background ==
It is not known when Huangfu Bo was born, but it is known that his family was from Jing Prefecture (涇州, in modern Pingliang, Gansu) and traced its ancestry to the ducal house of the Spring and Autumn period state Song. According to his biography in the Old Book of Tang, both his grandfather Huangfu Linji (皇甫鄰幾) and father Huangfu Yu (皇甫愉) served as prefectural prefects, although according to the table of the chancellors' family trees in the New Book of Tang, both Huangfu Linji and Huangfu Yu were without offices. He had at least one older brother, Huangfu Yong (皇甫鏞).

== Early career ==
Early in the Zhenyuan era (785–805) of Emperor Dezong, Huangfu Bo passed the imperial examinations in the class of examinees considered of good character with literary talents. He was thereafter made an imperial censor with the title Jiancha Yushi (監察御史). He left government office when his mother died to observe a mourning period for her. After the mourning period was over, he was set to return to governmental service but, as he was accused of having conducted tours when he was supposed to be mourning his mother, he was made a member of the staff of the household of the Crown Prince. He later became Libu Yuanwailang (吏部員外郎), a low-level official at the ministry of civil service affairs (吏部, Libu), in charge of selecting non-official-status government employees. He served in this capacity for three years, and it was said that he was capable in stopping inappropriate candidates from being selected. He was thereafter promoted to be Libu Langzhong (吏部郎中), a supervisorial official at the ministry of civil service affairs.

== As Minister of Finance ==
As of 816, during the reign of Emperor Dezong's grandson Emperor Xianzong, Huangfu Bo was serving as the ministry of agriculture (司農卿, Sinong Qing), when he was given the additional titles of deputy chief imperial censor (御史中丞, Yushi Zhongcheng) and director of finances. This was said to be the start of Huangfu's use of his money-gathering skills to please Emperor Xianzong. He was thereafter made deputy minister of census (戶部侍郎, Hubu Shilang) and continued to be the director of finances as well. At that time, Emperor Xianzong was conducting a campaign against the warlord Wu Yuanji, who controlled Zhangyi Circuit (彰義, headquartered in modern Zhumadian, Henan), and much revenue was needed. Huangfu was said to be harsh in his extraction of money. He drew Emperor Xianzong's favor and was also given the additional title of chief imperial censor (御史大夫, Yushi Daifu). When Emperor Xianzong's close associate Zhang Su (張宿) resented the chancellors Cui Qun and Wang Ya for opposing his appointment as a high-level consultant, Zhang became allied with Huangfu as well, against the chancellors. Huangfu also ingratiated himself with the powerful eunuch Tutu Chengcui by offering Tutu bribes.

== As chancellor ==
In 818, after Wu Yuanji was defeated, Emperor Xianzong was said to begin to be wasteful in his spending. As both Huangfu Bo and the director of salt and iron monopolies Cheng Yi were considered capable in getting him revenues, he made both Huangfu and Cheng chancellors de facto with the title Tong Zhongshu Menxia Pingzhangshi (同中書門下平章事), over the strenuous objections of Cui Qun and Pei Du. Pei, indeed, wrote a harshly worded objection that criticized Cheng but even more so Huangfu, and he requested to resign rather than to serve with them. Emperor Xianzong did not accept Pei's resignation or his criticism of either Huangfu or Cheng. Meanwhile, Huangfu was carrying out a scheme where the excess palace supplies were sold to the government in exchange for money at market value—even though the excess palace supplies were often of poor quality or had deteriorated such that they could no longer be used—so that the palace treasury (separate from the imperial government treasury) would be replenished at the expense of the government. When Pei pointed this out to Emperor Xianzong, Huangfu pointed to his own boots and stated that he had himself bought the boots from the palace excess supplies, and that the boots were of high quality and durable. Emperor Xianzong thus did not believe Pei. Huangfu also proposed that the salaries of the officials be reduced to enrich the treasury. When the imperial attendant Cui Zhi (崔植) opposed this proposal, it was not carried out.

As, by this point, Emperor Xianzong favored alchemists who purportedly were capable of making medicines that brought immortality, Huangfu and another official, Li Daogu (李道古) recommended the alchemist Liu Mi (柳泌), who claimed to be able to make such medicines. In 819, it was said that because of Huangfu's machinations that Pei was sent out of the capital to serve as the military governor (jiedushi) of Hedong Circuit (河東, headquartered in modern Taiyuan, Shanxi). However, when he attacked the consultant Wu Ruheng (武儒衡), Emperor Xianzong, who knew that Wu Ruheng had frequently criticized Huangfu, did not act on Huangfu's accusations. It was said that because Huangfu passed the imperial examinations the same year as Linghu Chu, he recommended Linghu to be chancellor in 819 as well.

Later in 819, there was an occasion when Emperor Xianzong asked the chancellors why the reign of his ancestor Emperor Xuanzong started out well but ended in disaster. Cui pointed out that initially, Emperor Xuanzong trusted such chancellors as Yao Chong, Song Jing, Lu Huaishen, Su Ting, Han Xiu, and Zhang Jiuling, but late in the reign trusted such chancellors as Yuwen Rong, Li Linfu, and Yang Guozhong, and that it was his poor selection of chancellors at the end that led to the disaster. It was said that because this comment was viewed as directed at Huangfu, Huangfu much resented Cui for the comment. He struck back at Cui late in the year, as earlier in the year, the officials had offered Emperor Xianzong the honorary title of Emperor Yuanhe Shengwen Shenwu Fatian Yingdao (元和聖文神武法天應道皇帝). Huangfu initially wanted two additional characters—Xiaode (孝德, "filial and virtuous"). Cui opined, "Sheng [(聖)] encompassed filial piety," and therefore did not include them. Huangfu thus told Emperor Xianzong, "Cui did not want Your Imperial Majesty to have the characters 'Xiaode.'" At that time, the troops sent to the borders with Tufan were receiving supplies of poor quality and were so displeased that they were on the verge of mutiny—so much so that their commander, the general Li Guangyan, was so distressed to consider suicide. Li Guangyan reported this to Emperor Xianzong, but Huangfu informed Emperor Xianzong that there was nothing wrong with the supplies and that it was Cui who encouraged the soldiers to complain. Emperor Xianzong believed Huangfu, and around the new year 820, Cui was sent out of the capital to serve as the governor (觀察使, Guanchashi) of Hunan Circuit (湖南, headquartered in modern Changsha, Hunan). It was said that because of this action, the people hated Huangfu.

Meanwhile, Liu, whom Emperor Xianzong had made the prefect of Tai Prefecture (台州, in modern Taizhou, Zhejiang) in hopes that he could find the proper ingredients for the immortality medicine in the mountains of Tai Prefecture, conscripted the people of Tai Prefecture to seek such ingredients, but for over a year was unsuccessful. He became fearful and fled into the mountains himself. The governor of Zhedong Circuit (浙東, headquartered in modern Shaoxing, Zhejiang), which Tai Prefecture belonged to, arrested him and delivered him to the capital Chang'an. Under the protection of Huangfu and Li Daogu, however, Emperor Xianzong continued to trust Liu and continued to take medications that he made. The side effects of the medication caused Emperor Xianzong to become often thirsty and ill-tempered.

== Downfall ==
In 820, Emperor Xianzong died and was succeeded by his son Emperor Muzong. Emperor Muzong immediately exiled Huangfu Bo to be the census officer at Yai Prefecture (崖州, in modern Haikou, Hainan). It was said that the people rejoiced at the news of Huangfu's exile. It was further said that Emperor Muzong was initially ready to kill Huangfu because he believed that Huangfu, like Tutu Chengcui, supported his brother Li Yun (李惲) the Prince of Li instead of him. But, as new chancellor Xiao Mian, like Linghu Chu, passed the imperial examinations the same year as Huangfu and thus was friendly with him, interceded on his behalf along with a number of eunuchs doing the same, Huangfu was spared. Liu Mi and the Buddhist monk Datong (大通), whom Huangfu had also recommended, were caned to death. Late in the year, news arrived from Yai Prefecture that Huangfu had died.

== Notes and references ==
- Old Book of Tang, vol. 135.
- New Book of Tang, vol. 167.
- Zizhi Tongjian, vols. 239, 240, 241.
