= Zhu Kerong =

Zhu Kerong (Chinese: 朱克融) (died 826), formally the Prince of Wuxing (吳興王), was a military governor (jiedushi) of the Chinese dynasty Tang dynasty who ruled Lulong Circuit (盧龍, headquartered in modern Beijing) independent of the imperial authority during the reigns of Emperor Muzong and Emperor Jingzong, until he and his son Zhu Yanling (朱延齡) were killed by their own soldiers in 826.

== Background ==
It is not known when Zhu Kerong was born. His granduncle Zhu Ci and grandfather Zhu Tao had successively ruled Lulong Circuit from 772 until Zhu Tao's death in 785, upon which the Lulong soldiers supported Zhu Tao's cousin Liu Peng. Zhu Kerong's father Zhu Hui (朱洄) remained at Lulong Circuit and appeared to have served as an officer under Liu Peng, Liu Peng's son Liu Ji, and grandson Liu Zong, as Zhu Hui was later referred to as a senior officer. Zhu Kerong, in his youth, also became an officer under Liu Zong.

== During Emperor Muzong's reign ==
After Liu Zong submitted to imperial authority in 818, during the reign of Emperor Xianzong, he became concerned, as Lulong had long been unaccustomed to following imperial orders, that a number of officers were difficult to control and would create problems later on. Around the time that Emperor Xianzong died and was succeeded by his son Emperor Muzong, Liu Zong sent those officers to the capital Chang'an and requested the imperial government give them commissions and honors, with the hopes that the honors received by those officers would encourage the Lulong officers in being faithful to the imperial government. Liu Zong himself resigned his governorship in spring 821, took tonsure, and became a Buddhist monk. Prior to doing so, as Liu was concerned that his officers might not abide by the decision he made, he further proposed that Lulong be divided into three circuits, with the circuit capital, You Prefecture (幽州), along with Zhuo Prefecture (涿州, in modern Baoding, Hebei), be given to former chancellor Zhang Hongjing; Ji (薊州, in modern Tianjin), Gui (媯州, in modern Zhangjiakou, Hebei), and Tan (檀州, in modern Beijing) Prefectures be given to the general Xue Ping; and Ying (瀛州) and Mo (莫州, both in modern Cangzhou, Hebei) Prefectures be given to the official Lu Shimei (盧士玫). (Liu had made these recommendations on the bases that when Zhang ruled Hedong, which neighbored Lulong, Liu had often heard good opinions of Zhang's governance; that Xue was the son of Xue Song and familiar with the region; and that Lu was a relative of Liu's wife's.)

Emperor Muzong accepted Liu's submission, but did not fully implement Liu's partition plan; Ying and Mo were given to Lu Shimei, but the remaining prefectures were all given to Zhang, under the suggestion of the chancellors Cui Zhi and Du Yuanying, who did not understand the rationale of Liu's plan. Further, Zhu and the other officers that Liu sent to Chang'an were not given offices or salaries, and it was said that as they lacked income, they fell into financial desperation, even requiring loans for their food and clothing, despite their frequent submission of requests for offices to Cui and Du. When Zhang arrived at Lulong, he ordered Zhu and the others to return to Lulong, further angering them. Meanwhile, Zhang further drew the anger of the people and soldiers of Lulong over a number of actions:

- In contrast to the past military governors' willingness to bear the difficulties with the people, including the weather conditions, when Zhang was arriving at You Prefecture, he was in a litter borne by eight men, shocking the people of You Prefecture.
- Zhang Hongjing was solemn and arrogant, not willing to speak with the people, and he rarely accepted advice from guests and the army officers.
- He gave much authority to his assistants Wei Yong (韋雍) and Zhang Zonghou (張宗厚), and these assistants were disrespectful of soldiers and extravagant in their living — such that, shocking to the people of You Prefecture, they were often feasting deep into the night and going home after midnight, with their guards loudly escorting them.
- When Liu submitted to imperial authority, Emperor Muzong ordered a large cash reward for the Lulong soldiers, but Zhang Hongjing took 20% of the award for headquarter expenses.
- The people of You Prefecture had venerated the leading figures of the Anshi Rebellion, An Lushan and Shi Siming, and referred to them as the "Two Holy Men." Zhang Hongjing, wanting to change this custom, had An and Shi exhumed and their caskets destroyed, causing resentment among the people.

In fall 821, when a low-level officer accidentally collided with Wei's guards, Wei ordered the officer whipped, but the other officers were unaccustomed to this kind of punishment and refused to carry out the punishment. Zhang Hongjing had the officers arrested. That night, the soldiers mutinied, killed Wei and several other staff member of Zhang's, and put Zhang under arrest. The next day, the mutineers began to regret their actions, but when they met Zhang to ask for forgiveness, Zhang did not speak at all. The mutineers believed that Zhang was not intending to pardon them, and instead supported Zhu Kerong's father Zhu Hui to serve as the acting military governor. Zhu Hui declined, but recommended Zhu Kerong, and the soldiers agreed.

The imperial government reacted to the mutiny by ordering that Zhang be demoted, while transferring Liu Wu the military governor of Zhaoyi Circuit (昭義, headquartered in modern Changzhi, Shanxi) to Lulong. Liu Wu, however, feared Zhu Kerong's strength and did not dare to try to head to Lulong, so Emperor Muzong allowed him to return to Zhaoyi. Mo Prefecture troops soon mutinied as well and allowed Zhu's mutineers to enter Mo Prefecture; shortly thereafter, Ying Prefecture troops also mutinied and seized Lu and the eunuch monitor of the army, sending them to Zhu. Meanwhile, with Wang Tingcou also having mutinied, killed Tian Hongzheng the military governor of neighboring Chengde Circuit (成德, headquartered in modern Shijiazhuang, Hebei), and took over control of Chengde, Zhu and Wang allied and put Chengde's Shen Prefecture (深州, in modern Hengshui, Hebei), whose prefect Niu Yuanyi (牛元翼) had refused to follow Wang, under siege. Zhu also attacked Yiwu Circuit (義武, headquartered in modern Baoding, Hebei)'s Yi Prefecture (易州, in modern Baoding) and Hedong Circuit (河東, headquartered in modern Taiyuan, Shanxi)'s Wei Prefecture (蔚州, in modern Zhangjiakou). Emperor Muzong declared a general campaign against both Wang and Zhu, but the imperial armies soon were bogged down, and the imperial treasury could not afford fighting both circuits. In winter 821, the chancellors thus suggested that, as Zhu had spared Zhang and Wang had killed Tian, there was a difference between them and that Zhu should be pardoned. Emperor Muzong agreed, and commissioned Zhu as the military governor of Lulong. After receiving the commission, Zhu released Zhang and Lu to the imperial government. However, Zhu and Wang (who was also pardoned and commissioned shortly after) continued to have Shen Prefecture under siege, and after they captured Gonggao (弓高, in modern Cangzhou) to cut off the supply routes for the imperial troops, the imperial forces and Niu were in desperate straits. When Pei Du the military governor of Hedong sent letters to rebuke them, Zhu withdrew from Shen Prefecture, although Wang continued to put Shen Prefecture under siege, forcing Niu to eventually fight his way out of the siege.

In summer 822, Zhu submitted a tribute of horses and goats to the imperial government — but as part of the tribute, demanded rewards for his soldiers. It is not clear how the imperial government reacted.

== During Emperor Jingzong's reign ==
In 826, by which time Emperor Muzong's son Emperor Jingzong was emperor, there was an occasion when imperial eunuch messengers were delivering new uniforms to the circuits. When the uniforms reached Lulong Circuit, Zhu Kerong complained that the uniforms were of low quality and detained the eunuchs. At that time, Emperor Jingzong was originally intent on visiting the eastern capital Luoyang and restoring the early Tang customs of the emperor spending time in both the main capital Chang'an and Luoyang. Both Wang Tingcou and Zhu sent arrogantly-worded offers to contribute troops to repair the long-ruined palaces and governmental offices at Luoyang, offers that Emperor Jingzong declined, and Emperor Jingzong subsequently abandoned the plan to visit Luoyang, at the urging of Pei Du, who was then chancellor. Zhu also demanded silk and claimed that the soldiers would clamor to rebel if he did not receive silk. Emperor Jingzong was angered, but at Pei's urging sent edicts with kind words to calm Zhu, and created him the Prince of Wuxing.

In summer 826, the Lulong soldiers mutinied and killed Zhu Kerong and his son Zhu Yanling. In the aftermaths, soldiers supported his younger son Zhu Yansi to take over the circuit. Later in the year, however, the officer Li Zaiyi killed Zhu Yansi and slaughtered the Zhu household — some 300 people.

== Notes and references ==
- Old Book of Tang, vol. 180.
- New Book of Tang, vol. 212.
- Zizhi Tongjian, vols. 241, 242, 243.
