= Wang Tingcou =

Wang Tingcou (王廷湊 or 王庭湊; died 834), formally the Duke of Taiyuan (太原公), was a general of the Chinese Tang dynasty who, in 821, during the reign of Emperor Muzong, took over control of Chengde Circuit (成德, headquartered in modern Shijiazhuang, Hebei) and thereafter ruled it in a de facto independent manner from the imperial government. He was said to be particularly cruel even for a warlord. After his death, his family held onto control of the circuit, even after the end of Tang dynasty, until his great-great-grandson Wang Rong was overthrown in 921 – 100 years after Wang Tingcou had initially taken over the circuit.

== Background ==
It is not known when Wang Tingcou was born. His ancestors were of the Uyghur Abusi (阿布思) tribe, which had been submissive to the Tang dynasty Protectorate General to Pacify the East. His great-grandfather Wugezhi (五哥之) came to serve under Li Baochen the military governor (Jiedushi) of Chengde and Li Baochen's son Li Weiyue. After Li Weiyue's death, Li Weiyue's successor Wang Wujun, because of Wugezhi's bravery in battle, adopted Wugezhi as a son, and thus Wugezhi took on the surname of Wang. Both Wang Tingcou's grandfather Wang Modahuo (王末怛活) and father Wang Shengchao (王升朝) continued to serve under Wang Wujun's family as cavalry officers. Wang Tingcou himself was said to be brave and quiet, but decisive.

== During Emperor Muzong's reign ==
When Wang Wujun's grandson Wang Chengzong died in 820, Wang Chengzong's brother Wang Chengyuan temporarily took over command of the circuit but requested to be transferred, fearing to be targeted as a warlord. At that time, Wang Tingcou served as the commander of Wang Chengyuan's guards. Then-reigning Emperor Muzong transferred Tian Hongzheng the military governor of Weibo Circuit (魏博, headquartered in modern Handan, Hebei) to Chengde and transferred Wang Chengyuan to Yicheng Circuit (義成, headquartered in modern Anyang, Henan). Wang Chengyuan subsequently left Chengde and headed for Yicheng despite the attempts by some soldiers to detain him at Chengde.

However, Tian, while at Weibo, had engaged in many campaigns against Chengde, and therefore was hated by the Chengde soldiers. He therefore took 2,000 Weibo soldiers to Chengde with him to protect him. He requested the imperial government to pay these soldiers' salaries. The director of finances, Cui Ling (崔倰), however, did not realize the seriousness of the situation and rejected Tian's request. Tian was forced to send the Weibo soldiers back to Weibo. Meanwhile, Wang Tingcou had been inciting the soldiers against Tian, and as soon as Weibo soldiers left, in fall 821, he gathered the troops at Chengde's capital Zhen Prefecture (鎮州) and attacked Tian's headquarters, killing Tian, his staff members, and their families — some 300 people. He forced the eunuch monitor of the army, Song Weicheng (宋惟澄), to submit a request on his behalf to be made military governor. Meanwhile, he had Wang Jinji (王進岌), the prefect of another of Chengde's prefectures, Ji Prefecture (冀州, in modern Hengshui, Hebei) assassinated and took over Ji Prefecture. The prefect of another of Chengde's prefectures, Shen Prefecture (深州, in modern Hengshui), Niu Yuanyi (牛元翼), refused to follow Wang and followed orders from the imperial general Li Su, who had succeeded Tian as the military governor of Weibo. Emperor Muzong named Niu the new military governor of Chengde. However, Li Su soon grew ill, and his command was instead given to Tian's son Tian Bu. When five Chengde officers, led by Wang Jian (王儉), tried to assassinate Wang Tingcou, Wang Tingcou not only killed them but also the 3,000 soldiers under their command. He subsequently took his own soldiers and those of his ally Zhu Kerong (who had seized Lulong Circuit (盧龍, headquartered in modern Beijing)) and put Shen Prefecture under siege.

The imperial troops soon tried to attack Wang Tingcou from three directions — Pei Du the military governor of Hedong Circuit (河東, headquartered in modern Taiyuan, Shanxi) from the west, Tian Bu from the south, and Wu Chongyin the military governor of Henghai Circuit (橫海, headquartered in modern Cangzhou, Hebei) from the east. (Wu was soon succeeded by Li Guangyan.) After the key outpost Gonggao (弓高, in modern Cangzhou) fell to Zhu's troops in spring 822, however, the imperial army's own supply routes, as well as the supply routes for Shen Prefecture, were cut off. With Shen Prefecture in dire straits, Emperor Muzong was forced to commission Wang Tingcou the military governor of Chengde. Wang accepted the commission, but refused to lift the siege on Shen Prefecture, even when the imperial official Han Yu was sent to urge him. Eventually, Niu fought his way out of the siege, and his subordinate Zang Ping (臧平) surrendered. Wang rebuked Zang for defending the city for too long and executed Zang and 180 other officials in the city. When Emperor Muzong subsequently sent the eunuch messenger Yang Zaichang (楊再昌) to Wang to order him to turn over Tian Hongzheng's body and Niu's family, Wang responded that Tian's body could no longer be located and that he would soon release Niu's family — but he never actually did so, despite Niu's repeatedly sending Wang gifts and requests to release his family, while Niu served as the military governor of Shannan East Circuit (山南東道, headquartered in modern Xiangfan, Hubei), until Niu's death in 823.

== During Emperor Jingzong's and Emperor Wenzong's reigns ==
Shortly after Emperor Muzong died in 824 and was succeeded by his son Emperor Jingzong, Wang Tingcou heard of Niu Yuanyi's death and slaughtered Niu's family — leading the new emperor to lament that the chancellors were incompetent. As of 826, Emperor Jingzong was originally intent on visiting the eastern capital Luoyang and restoring the early Tang customs of the emperor spending time in both the main capital Chang'an and Luoyang. Both Wang and Zhu Kerong sent arrogantly worded offers to contribute troops to repair the long-ruined palaces and governmental offices at Luoyang, offers that Emperor Jingzong declined, and Emperor Jingzong subsequently abandoned the plan to visit Luoyang, at the urging of the senior chancellor Pei Du.

Also in 826, after Li Quanlüe (李全略) the military governor of Henghai Circuit died, his son Li Tongjie took over the circuit without imperial sanction. The imperial government initially took no reaction against Li Tongjie. After Emperor Jingzong was assassinated in late 826 and was succeeded by his brother Emperor Wenzong, Li Tongjie hoped that the new regime would be willing to let him inherit the circuit, and in early 827 sent his secretary Cui Congzhang (崔從長) and his brothers Li Tongzhi (李同志) and Li Tongsun (李同巽) to Chang'an to pay homage to Emperor Wenzong. Emperor Wenzong, however, did not intend to let Li Tongjie take over the circuit, subsequently issued an edict transferring Wu Chongyin from Tianping Circuit (天平, headquartered in modern Tai'an, Shandong) to Henghai and Li Tongjie to Yanhai Circuit (兗海, headquartered in modern Jining, Shandong). As the imperial government was concerned that the other circuit governors would encourage Li Tongjie to resist, Emperor Wenzong bestowed various honorific titles on the military governors, including Wang, around Henghai. Wang, however, requested commission for Li Tongjie, and when his request was denied, mobilized his own troops to interfere with the operations by Weibo's military governor Shi Xiancheng against Henghai. He also tried to bribe the Shatuo chieftain Zhuxie Zhiyi (朱邪執宜), trying to get Zhuxie to ally with him, but Zhuxie refused.

Emperor Wenzong subsequently declared a general campaign against Li Tongjie, but with Wang assisting Li Tongjie and supplying him with both troops and supplies in the other circuits' campaign against Li Tongjie, in fall 828, Emperor Wenzong declared Wang a renegade but did not order a campaign against him, merely ordering the other circuits to treat him as a renegade and wait for his repentance. Soon thereafter, however, he stripped Wang and his sons of their titles and ordered a general campaign against him. Meanwhile, with the other circuits' armies making headway against Li Tongjie and Wang unable to relieve him, in winter 828, Wang persuaded the Weibo officer Qi Zhishao (亓志紹) to rebel and turn against Shi, attacking Weibo's capital Wei Prefecture (魏州). Emperor Wenzong was forced to order the troops from Yicheng and Heyang (河陽, headquartered in modern Luoyang, Henan) to aid Weibo. In spring 829, after Shi Xiancheng's son Shi Tang (史唐) and the military governor of Yicheng, Li Ting (李聽), defeated Qi, Qi fled to Chengde. After Li Tongjie soon surrendered but was killed by the imperial official Bo Qi (柏耆) after he surrendered, Emperor Wenzong thereafter resumed the posture of declaring Wang a renegade but not waging a campaign against him. Wang soon sent a letter to Li Cheng the military governor of Hedong Circuit, offering to resubmit and surrender Henghai's Jing Prefecture (景州, in modern Cangzhou), which Wang had seized during the campaign, and reporting that Qi had committed suicide. In fall 829, Emperor Wenzong pardoned Wang and his subordinates and restored their titles.

Wang Tingcou was subsequently created the Duke of Taiyuan. In 834, he died. The soldiers supported his son Wang Yuankui to succeed him, and Emperor Wenzong subsequently approved. Wang Tingcou was given posthumous honors. Wang Tingcou's biography in the Old Book of Tang commented:

Ever since the time of Li Baochen, although Zhenji [(i.e., Chengde)] saw the rebellions of Li Weiyue and Wang Chengzong, it nevertheless befriended its neighbors and feared the law, hoping to be forgiven. But as it comes to being violent, malevolent, treasonous, having no regard for the emperor, and being unkind, none exceeded Wang Tingcou.

== Notes and references ==
- Old Book of Tang, vol. 142.
- New Book of Tang, vol. 211.
- Zizhi Tongjian, vols. 241, 242, 243, 244, 245.
