= Emperor Jingzong of Tang =

Emperor of Tang China from 824 to 827

Emperor Jingzong of Tang 唐敬宗
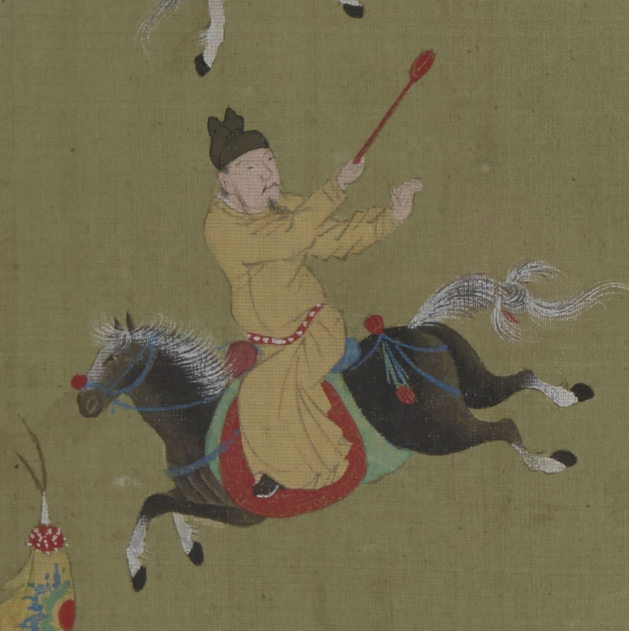
- Emperor Jingzong as depicted in the 18th-century Chinese-French edition of the Dijian Tushuo, Recueil Historique de Principaux Traits de la Vie des Empereurs Chinois

Emperor of the Tang dynasty
- Reign: February 29, 824 – January 9, 827
- Predecessor: Emperor Muzong
- Successor: Emperor Wenzong
- Born: July 22, 809
- Died: January 9, 827 (aged 17)
- Burial: Zhuang Mausoleum (莊陵)
- Issue: Li Pu; Li Xiufu; Li Zhizhong; Li Yanyang; Li Chengmei; Princess Yongxing; Princess Tianchang; Princess Ning
Full name
- Family name: Lǐ (李); Given name: Zhàn (湛)
Era name and dates
- Baǒlì (寶曆): January 23, 825 – March 14, 827
Posthumous name
- Emperor Zhaomin (昭湣皇帝) (short); Emperor Ruiwu Zhaomin Xiao (睿武昭湣孝皇帝) (full)
Temple name
- Jìngzōng (敬宗)
- House: Li
- Dynasty: Tang
- Father: Emperor Muzong
- Mother: Empress Gongxi

Tang Jingzong
- Chinese: 唐敬宗
- Literal meaning: "Venerate Ancestor of the Tang"
Transcriptions
Standard Mandarin
- Hanyu Pinyin: Táng Jìngzōng

Li Zhan
- Chinese: 李湛
- Literal meaning: (personal name)
Transcriptions
Standard Mandarin
- Hanyu Pinyin: Lǐ Zhàn

Emperor Jingzong of Tang (July 22, 809 – January 9, 827), personal name Li Zhan, was the 16th emperor of China's Tang dynasty. He reigned from 824 to 827. Emperor Jingzong was the eldest son of Emperor Muzong and elder brother of the later Emperor Wenzong and Emperor Wuzong.

Emperor Jingzong became emperor at the early age of 15 and his short reign would be overshadowed by corrupt eunuchs with control over the imperial Shence Army (神策軍), who would come to dominate his rule as well as that of his younger brother Emperor Wenzong. Uninterested in ruling, Jingzong gave in to pleasure seeking and lived in opulence while eunuchs such as Wang Shoucheng and officials such as Li Fengji held onto real power.

Around the new year 827, after reigning less than four years, emperor Jingzong was assassinated by a group of conspirators. Emperor Jingzong was only 17 when he died.

== Prior to reign ==
Li Zhan was born in 809, as the oldest son to then-Prince of Sui, Li You, a son of then-reigning Emperor Xianzong. His mother was Li You's concubine Consort Wang, who gave birth to Li Zhan at a side hall of the Eastern Palace (i.e., the palace of the Crown Prince, although Li You was not then Crown Prince).

In 821, by which time Emperor Xianzong had died, and Li You (whose name had been changed to Li Heng by that point) was emperor (as Emperor Muzong), Emperor Muzong created a number of his younger brothers and sons imperial princes, and Li Zhan was created the Prince of Jing.

Around new year 823, when Emperor Muzong was at a polo match, there was a mishap where a eunuch fell from his horse—causing much shock for Emperor Muzong and leading to a debilitating stroke, causing him to be unable to rise. Many officials, including the leading officials Pei Du and Li Fengji requested that he create a crown prince, and Emperor Muzong, after initially not responding, created Li Zhan crown prince.

In spring 824, Emperor Muzong, who had initially recovered from his illness, grew ill again. He issued an order having Li Zhan serve as regent during his illness, and even though the eunuchs requested that Emperor Muzong's mother Empress Dowager Guo declare herself regent, she resisted the request—stating that she did not want to be like Wu Zetian. That night, Emperor Muzong died, and Li Zhan took the throne (as Emperor Jingzong).

== Reign ==
Emperor Jingzong honored his grandmother Empress Dowager Guo as Grand Empress Dowager, while honoring his mother Consort Wang as Empress Dowager.

Right from the start of his reign, Emperor Jingzong became known for wastefulness and a lack of diligence. His immediate acts included:

- Between the third and fifth days of his enthronement Emperor Jingzong awarded a large number of eunuchs official uniforms, colored silks, and treasures, including multiple awards.
- Spending a great amount of time on polo, feasting, games, and music (and giving lavish rewards to musicians).
- Often being very late for imperial meetings, causing officials to wait him for hours. However, when the advisory officials Li Bo (李渤) and Liu Qichu (劉栖楚) petitioned him to stop this behavior, he rewarded them and later promoted Liu, although it was unclear whether he took their advice to heart.
- When Yuchi Rui (尉遲銳), the prefect of Long Prefecture (龍州, in modern Mianyang, Sichuan) submitted a petition stating that Niuxin Mountain (牛心山) was mystically connected to the Tang dynasty's divine protection, and that the mountain's structure should be repaired, Emperor Jingzong agreed, conscripting tens of thousands of men to work on the construction, which was difficult and dangerous. It was said that Dongchuan Circuit (東川, headquartered in modern Mianyang and which included Long Prefecture) had its strengths drained as a result.

=== Zheng and Su ===
There was a most unusual disturbance occurring at the capital Chang'an, three months after Emperor Jingzong ascended the throne. The fortune teller Su Xuanming (蘇玄明) and the imperial textile servant Zhang Shao (張韶) were friendly with each other, and Su informed Zhang that he saw, in Zhang's future, that he would sit on the imperial throne and dine with Su. Su pointed out to Zhang that because Emperor Jingzong spent his days hunting and playing games the palace would often lack security. Zhang gathered his fellow servants and street hoodlums and on a day when Emperor Jingzong was playing polo at Qingsi Hall (清思殿), Zhang and Su launched their attack on the palace. Emperor Jingzong, in panic, fled the palace to the camps of the Left Shence Army (左神策軍), commanded by the eunuch Ma Cunliang (馬存亮). Ma protected Emperor Jingzong and sent his officer Kang Yiquan (康藝全) with an army to the palace to secure it. Cavalry soldiers were also dispatched to escort Grand Empress Dowager Guo and Empress Wang to the Left Shence Army camps. Meanwhile, Zhang sat on the imperial throne and dined with Su—fulfilling Su's prophecy—but then realized what disaster he had brought on himself. He tried to flee, but by that time, Kang and the Right Shence Army (右神策軍) officer Shang Guozhong (尚國忠) had arrived at the palace. They attacked and killed Zhang, Su, and most of their followers; the surviving followers hid in the imperial gardens, but were found the next day. Emperor Jingzong did not return to the palace until the following day, and it was said that the officials and the public were all shocked and, for some time, unaware where the emperor was.

Meanwhile, Emperor Jingzong appeared to appreciate various advice for him to change his behavior, often rewarding those who offered such advice (including the future chancellors Wei Chuhou and Li Deyu), but did not seem to change his behavior. He also was often spending time with eunuchs and servants, not attending to the affairs of state. The chancellor Niu Sengru, feeling that he could do nothing in this political climate, resigned and went out of the capital to serve as a military governor (Jiedushi). Emperor Jingzong's association with the eunuchs was so close that, in 825, when Cui Fa (崔發) the magistrate of Hu County (鄠縣, in modern Xi'an, Shaanxi), on report of a disturbance, arrested some of the people involved in the disturbance—who turned out to be eunuchs—Emperor Jingzong took the arrest personally, had Cui arrested, and refused to have Cui released even after a general pardon had been declared; he further either ordered or permitted the eunuchs to batter Cui so severely that he almost died. Only after the chancellor Li Fengji pleaded for Cui—pointing out that Cui's mother, a sister to the former chancellor Wei Guanzhi, was old and ill—did Emperor Jingzong release Cui.

One of the few major debates as to policy during Emperor Jingzong's reign occurred in 825, when Liu Wu the military governor of Zhaoyi Circuit (昭義, headquartered in modern Changzhi, Shanxi), died, and in his will requested that his son Liu Congjian be allowed to inherit the circuit. The former chancellor Li Jiang advocated that Emperor Jingzong not allow Liu Congjian to do so and take the circuit back under imperial control. However, Li Fengji and the powerful eunuch Wang Shoucheng disagreed, and eventually, Emperor Jingzong allowed Liu Congjian to inherit the circuit.

Meanwhile, Emperor Jingzong continued to, in addition to games, have a desire to tour the realm, despite the pleas from advisory officials not to do so. For example, in 825, despite many pleas not to, he visited Mount Li (驪山). He also continued to prepare for a visit to the eastern capital Luoyang, even though such visits required great expenses—since the eastern capital, long damaged by campaigns ever since the Anshi Rebellion, required extensive repairs to its palace if it were to receive the emperor. Only after that explanation by the chancellor Pei Du in 826, as well as semi-mocking offers by the warlords Zhu Kerong and Wang Tingcou to assist the repairs, did Emperor Jingzong abandon the idea of visiting Luoyang.

== Death ==
Meanwhile, it was said that Emperor Jingzong endeared himself to eunuchs, polo players and strong men who would arm wrestle with him by rewarding them greatly, but being impulsive, if he ever became angry at them, he would often exile them, seize their households, or batter them. It was said that these attendants began to resent and fear him. On January 9, 827, Emperor Jingzong was out hunting, and after finishing the hunt, he returned to the palace and was drinking with 28 people, including the eunuchs Liu Keming (劉克明), Tian Wucheng (田務澄), Xu Wenduan (許文端), and the polo players Su Zuoming (蘇佐明), Wang Jiaxian (王嘉憲), Shi Congkuan (石從寬), and Yan Weizhi (閻惟直). At one point, he got up from his seat to go to the latrine—and as he did, the candles suddenly went out, and Su and his colleagues took the opportunity to kill him. After that occurred, Liu summoned the imperial scholar Lu Sui to draft a will for Emperor Jingzong, putting Emperor Muzong's younger brother Li Wu the Prince of Jiàng in charge of the state.

The next morning, the will was issued, and Li Wu, while not yet ascending the throne, received the chancellors and the other officials, acting as if he were emperor. Meanwhile, Liu intended to eliminate the most powerful eunuchs. In response, the directors of palace communications Wang Shoucheng and Yang Chenghe (楊承和), and the commanders of the Shence Armies Wei Congjian (魏從簡) and Liang Shouqian (梁守謙) reacted by gathering the Shence Armies, as well as the Flying Dragon Soldiers (飛龍兵), to attack Liu's group and to escort Emperor Jingzong's younger brother Li Han the Prince of Jiāng (note different tone) to the palace. The Shence Armies and the Flying Dragon Soldiers attacked Liu's party, killing most of them, including Li Wu. Liu tried to commit suicide by jumping into a well, but was dragged out and beheaded. Subsequently, under the advice of Wei Chuhou, Wang publicly declared what had occurred, and had Grand Empress Dowager Guo name Li Han the new emperor. Li Han subsequently took the throne (as Emperor Wenzong).

== Chancellors during reign ==
- Li Fengji (824–826)
- Niu Sengru (824–825)
- Li Cheng (824–826)
- Dou Yizhi (824–827)
- Pei Du (826–827)

== Family ==
- Noble Consort Guo, of the Guo clan (貴妃 郭氏)
  - Li Pu, Crown Prince Daohuai (悼懷皇太子 李普; 824–828), first son
  - Li Yanyang, Prince Ji (紀王 李言揚; 826–841), fourth son
- Unknown
  - Li Xiufu, Prince Liang (梁王 李休復), second son
  - Li Zhizhong, Prince Xiang (襄王 李執中), third son
  - Li Chengmei, Prince Chen (陳王 李成美; d. 840), sixth son
  - Princess Yongxing (永興公主)
  - Princess Tianchang (天長公主)
  - Princess Ning (寧公主; d. 881)
- Lovers
  - Female dancer Fengluan (凤鸾)

Regnal titles
Preceded by Emperor Muzong of Tang	Emperor of the Tang dynasty 824–827	Succeeded by Emperor Wenzong of Tang
