= Wei Chun =

Wei Chun may refer to:

- Wei Guanzhi (760–821), chancellor during Emperor Xianzong's reign
- Wei Chuhou (773–829), chancellor during Emperor Wenzong's reign
