= Empress Dowager Xiao (Tang dynasty) =

Empress dowager of Tang dynasty

Empress Dowager Xiao (蕭太后) (died June 1, 847), formally Empress Zhenxian (貞獻皇后, "the virtuous and wise empress"), known at times in her life as Empress Dowager Jiqing (積慶太后), was an empress dowager of the Chinese Tang dynasty. She was the mother of Emperor Wenzong and a concubine of Emperor Muzong.

== Background ==
It is not known when the future Empress Dowager Xiao was born, but it is known that she was from Fujian Circuit (福建, headquartered in modern Fuzhou, Fujian). She became a concubine of Li You, a son of Emperor Xianzong, while Li You was the Prince of Jian'an. At the time she left home, her parents had already died, and the only family member remaining at her home was a younger brother. She bore Li You a son, Li Han, in 809, when he was the Prince of Sui. In 821, by which time Li You's name had been changed to Li Heng and he had become emperor (as Emperor Muzong), Li Han was made the Prince of Jiāng, although it is not known what title she carried during Emperor Muzong's reign or the subsequent reign of Li Han's older brother, Emperor Jingzong, following Emperor Muzong's death in 824.

== As empress dowager ==
=== During Emperor Wenzong's reign ===
In 826, Emperor Jingzong was assassinated, purportedly by his polo players, led by Su Zuoming (蘇佐明). The eunuch Liu Keming (劉克明) initially supported Emperor Muzong's younger brother, Li Wu, the Prince of Jiàng (note different tone) to succeed Emperor Jingzong, but soon the eunuch army commanders Wang Shoucheng, Yang Chenghe (楊承和), Wei Congjian (魏從簡), and Liang Shouqian (梁守謙) killed Liu and Li Wu, supporting Li Han instead (as Emperor Wenzong, with his name changed from Li Han to Li Ang). Emperor Wenzong honored his mother as empress dowager while honoring Emperor Jingzong's mother as Empress Dowager Wang "Empress Dowager Baoli" ("Baoli" (寶曆) being Emperor Jingzong's era name). There were thus three empresses dowager in the palace at the time (along with Emperor Muzong's mother and Emperor Wenzong's grandmother Grand Empress Dowager Guo). It was said that Emperor Wenzong was filially pious and honored the three empresses dowager properly. Whenever he received valuable food items, he would first submit them to the ancestral temples, then the empresses dowager, before receiving them himself.

Emperor Wenzong made Empress Dowager Xiao's older sister the Lady of Xu. He also ordered that the governor of Fujian Circuit carry out a search for Empress Dowager Xiao's younger brother, whom she had not seen since her departure from home. The governor, however, could not locate her younger brother. There happened to be a worker at a tea shop, Xiao Hong (蕭洪), who claimed to have a lost sister. The merchant Zhao Zhen (趙縝) introduced Xiao Hong to the Lady of Xu's son-in-law Lü Zhang (呂璋) and through him, Xiao Hong met the Lady of Xu. The Lady of Xu could not tell whether he was their brother or not, and further introduced him to Empress Dowager Xiao. Emperor Wenzong came to believe that Xiao Hong was in fact his uncle, and therefore made him a member of the staff of the Crown Prince in 828. Xiao Hong later served as a general of the imperial guards, then as the military governor (Jiedushi) of Heyang Circuit (河陽, headquartered in modern Jiaozuo, Henan) and then of Fufang Circuit (鄜坊, headquartered in modern Yan'an, Shaanxi).

Later, however, Emperor Wenzong's chancellor, Li Xun, came to find out that Xiao Hong was not truly Empress Dowager Xiao's brother. Xiao Hong, fearful that Li Xun would report him, ingratiated Li Xun by inviting Li Xun's brother Li Zhongjing (李仲京) as a staff member. At that time, whenever the eunuch-commanded Shence Army (神策軍) officers went sent out to serve as military governors, the other Shence Army officers paid for their travel expenses but required that they be paid back threefold after they took office. One of Xiao's predecessors as the military governor of Fufang was a Shence Army officer, but died before he could pay back. The creditors were not satisfied and wanted Xiao to pay for his predecessor, but Xiao refused. When the creditors tried to collect from the predecessor's son, Xiao taught the son to seek intervention from Li Xun. Li Xun subsequently ruled that the son could refuse to pay the debts. After Li Xun was killed in the Ganlu Incident—a failed attempt by Emperor Wenzong, Li Xun, and Zheng Zhu to massacre the eunuchs—in 835, the powerful eunuch Qiu Shiliang, who commanded one of the two Shence Armies, thus came to resent Xiao Hong deeply.

Meanwhile, Empress Dowager Xiao's real brother remained at Fujian Circuit, but was said to be so weak in personality that he did not dare to assert himself as her brother. One of his acquaintances, Xiao Ben (蕭本), through conversations with him, came to know details about the names of his family members. Xiao Ben informed Qiu and accused Xiao Hong of falsely claiming to be Empress Dowager Xiao's brother. In 836, Xiao Hong was thus exiled to Huan Prefecture (驩州, in modern Nghệ An Province, Vietnam), but before he could reach Huan Prefecture, he was ordered to commit suicide. Emperor Wenzong, believing Xiao Ben to be his real uncle, made Xiao Ben a member of the staff of his son and crown prince, Li Yong.

In 837, Fujian Circuit submitted a report that one Xiao Hong (蕭弘, note different character than the Xiao Hong referred to above) claimed to be Empress Dowager Xiao's real brother. Emperor Wenzong ordered an investigation by the office of the imperial censors (御史台, Yushi Tai). Later that year, the office of the imperial censors concluded that Xiao Hong's claim was fraudulent. Emperor Wenzong sent him home but did not punish him. In 839, Liu Congjian the military governor of Zhaoyi Circuit (昭義, headquartered in modern Changzhi, Shanxi), where Xiao Hong had gone subsequently, submitted a petition vouching for Xiao Hong and claiming that the prior investigators ruled against him because Xiao Ben had the backing of the Left Shence Army (左神策軍). Emperor Wenzong ordered further investigations by not only the office of the imperial censors, but also by the ministry of justice (刑部, Xingbu) and the supreme court (大理寺, Dali Si). Later in the year, the three agencies submitted reports concluding that neither Xiao Ben nor Xiao Hong was Empress Dowager Xiao's brother. Xiao Ben was exiled to Ai Prefecture (愛州, in modern Thanh Hóa Province, Vietnam), while Xiao Hong was exiled to Dan Prefecture (儋州, headquartered in modern Danzhou, Hainan). Meanwhile, Empress Dowager Xiao's real brother remained in Fujian, and was never able to meet her.

=== During Emperor Wuzong's and Emperor Xuānzong's reigns ===
In 840, Emperor Wenzong died and was succeeded by his brother, Emperor Wuzong. Empress Dowager Xiao moved to Jiqing Hall (積慶殿) and thereafter became known as Empress Dowager Jiqing. She died in 847, during the reign of Emperor Wuzong's successor (a younger brother of Emperor Muzong's), Emperor Xuānzong.

== Notes and references ==
- Old Book of Tang, vol. 52.
- New Book of Tang, vol. 77.
- Zizhi Tongjian, vols. 243, 244, 245, 246, 248.
