= Li Shen =

Tang dynasty official and poet

Li Shen (李紳) (died July 29, 846), courtesy name Gongchui (公垂), formally Duke Wensu of Zhao (趙文肅公), was a Chinese historian, military general, poet, and politician of the Tang dynasty, serving as a chancellor during the reign of Emperor Wuzong.

== Background ==
It is not known when Li Shen was born. His family claimed ancestry from the southern branch of the prominent Li clan of Zhao Commandery (趙郡, roughly modern Shijiazhuang, Hebei), but was only able to trace its ancestry back to the Northern Wei official Li Shanquan (李善權) and Li Shanquan's descendants who served as officials of Northern Wei and Sui dynasty. Li Shen's great-grandfather Li Jingxuan served as a chancellor during the reign of Emperor Gaozong, and his great-granduncle Li Yuansu served as a chancellor during the reign of Emperor Gaozong's wife Wu Zetian. Both Li Shen's grandfather Li Shouyi (李守一) and father Li Wu (李晤) served as county magistrates. In Li Wu's case, he served three times at Jintan (金壇, in modern Changzhou, Jiangsu), Wucheng (烏程, in modern Huzhou, Jiangsu), and Jinling (晉陵, in modern Changzhou as well). He therefore settled his family in the region, at Wuxi.

Li Shen was five years old when Li Wu died, and he therefore was raised by his mother Lady Lu, who taught him the Confucian classics. It was said that Li Shen was short in stature but energetic, and was capable in songs and poetry. The year that he submitted himself to the local preliminary round of the imperial examinations, his poems became well known in the region.

== During Emperor Xianzong's reign ==
Early in the Yuanhe era (806–821) of Emperor Xianzong, Li Shen passed the imperial examinations, and he was there made an assistant professor at the imperial university (國子助教, Guozi Zhujiao). He did not like his role, however, and subsequently resigned and returned to his home region. The warlord Li Qi, who then ruled the region as the military governor (jiedushi) of Zhenhai Circuit (鎮海, headquartered in modern Zhenjiang, Jiangsu), was impressed with his talent and invited him to serve on staff as a secretary. According to the Old Book of Tang, Li Shen rejected Li Qi's invitation; Li Qi subsequently wanted to kill him, so he fled and hid until Li Qi was eventually defeated and killed. The New Book of Tang gave a different account – that Li Shen accepted the invitation and served under Li Qi, but subsequently, when Li Qi refused an imperial summons to pay homage to Emperor Xianzong in 807, he ordered Li Shen to draft his petition refusing the summons; Li Shen initially pretended to be unable to write due to extreme shock, but eventually told Li Qi that he would rather die than to draft such a petition; Li Qi thereafter threw him into jail, and he was only released after Li Qi was defeated.

== During Emperor Muzong's reign ==
As of the ascension of reign of Emperor Xianzong's son Emperor Muzong, Li Shen was serving as You Shiyi (右拾遺), a low-level advisory official at the legislative bureau of government (中書省, Zhongshu Sheng), when Emperor Muzong also made him an imperial scholar (翰林學士, Hanlin Xueshi). He and his colleagues Yuan Zhen and Li Deyu were known for their talent and friendship. He was also promoted, in his legislative bureau position, from You Shiyi to the higher rank of You Bujue (右補闕). In 821, he was made Sixun Yuanwailang (司勛員外郎), a low-level official at the ministry of civil service affairs (吏部, Libu), and put in charge of drafting edicts. He was also involved in an incident that was traditionally considered a cause of the later Niu-Li Factional Struggles. Both Li Shen and the former chancellor Duan Wenchang had submitted a list of examinees that they hoped would be passed to Qian Hui (錢徽), one of the officials in charge of the examinations that season, but once the results were published, the examinees that Duan and Li Shen recommended did not pass, while those who passed included the several relatives of other officials – Zheng Tan's brother Zheng Lang; Pei Du's son Pei Zhuan (裴譔); Li Zongmin's son-in-law Su Chao (蘇巢); and Yang Yinshi (楊殷士), brother to the other official in charge of the examinations that year, Yang Rushi (楊汝士). Duan complained to Emperor Muzong that the examinations that year were not fair. When Emperor Muzong consulted imperial scholars, several imperial scholars who were political enemies of Li Zongmin, including Li Deyu and Yuan, and Li Shen, all agreed with Duan. Emperor Muzong thus ordered a reexamination, while demoting Qian, Li Zongmin, and Yang Rushi, along with 10 examinees who passed based on perceived influence. When Qian's friends subsequently suggested that he submit Duan's and Li Shen's letters trying to influence the examinations to the emperor to show that they were the ones trying to influence results, Qian, who believed that revealing these private letters was inappropriate, burned them. (Later historians have typically regarded Li Shen as a leader of the Li Faction – named after Li Deyu, not him – during the Niu-Li Factional Struggles.)

In 822, Li Shen was made Zhongshu Sheren (中書舍人), a mid-level official at the legislative bureau, and continued to be in charge of drafting edicts. Soon thereafter, Yuan was made chancellor but only served a short time before he was removed, allegedly at the machination of his fellow chancellor Li Fengji. It was further said that Li Fengji wanted Niu Sengru to be chancellor, and believed that Li Deyu and Li Shen would oppose, and therefore had Li Deyu sent out of Chang'an to serve as the governor (觀察使, Guanchashi) of Zhexi Circuit (浙西, i.e., Zhenhai). However, he could not think of a way to remove Li Shen initially. In 823, the position of deputy chief imperial censor (御史中丞, Yushi Zhongcheng) was open, and Li Fengji recommended Li Shen for the post – and then manufactured a conflict between Li Shen and Han Yu the mayor of Jingzhao Municipality (京兆, i.e., the Chang'an region). (Per regulations, to honor the censors, the mayor of Jingzhao was supposed to pay tribute by visiting the Office of the Imperial Censors, but as Han was bestowed an honorary title as chief imperial censor, Li Fengji ordered that he did not have to carry out that regulation, leading to mutual accusations between Li Shen and Han of disrespect.) Li Fengji thus reported to Emperor Muzong that the two could not work with each other. As a result, Emperor Muzong made Han the deputy minister of defense (兵部侍郎, Bingbu Shilang) and Li Shen the governor of Jiangxi Circuit (江西, headquartered in modern Nanchang, Jiangxi). However, when Han and Li Shen went to visit Emperor Muzong to thank him for the commissions, he questioned them as to the nature of their conflict, and realized that Li Fengji had manufactured it. He thus kept Li Shen at Chang'an as the deputy minister of census (戶部侍郎, Hubu Shilang).

== During Emperor Jingzong's reign ==
In 824, Emperor Muzong died and was succeeded by his son Emperor Jingzong. Li Fengji, who remained powerful after the transition, continued to resent Li Shen, and soon thereafter his ally, the eunuch Wang Shoucheng, told Emperor Jingzong that Li Shen and the former chancellor Du Yuanying had supported Emperor Muzong's brother Li Cong (李悰) the Prince of Shen as emperor, rather than Emperor Jingzong. As a result, Li Shen was exiled and demoted to be the military advisor to the prefect of Duan Prefecture (端州, in modern Zhaoqing, Guangdong). Emperor Jingzong further agreed to put Li Shen to death, but after a defense of Li Shen submitted by the imperial scholar Wei Chuhou, Emperor Jingzong discovered past petitions in which Li Shen had sought to have him made crown prince. Emperor Jingzong, while not recalling Li Shen back to Chang'an, did not further carry out actions against Li Shen.

In 825, when Emperor Jingzong issued a general pardon, the text of the general pardon initially indicated that those exiled officials who had been moved closer to Chang'an previously could be again moved closer – without stating that those who had not been could be as well. Wei submitted an objection, pointing out that the text had been written in the way that it was because Li Fengji was apprehensive that Li Shen would be moved closer to the capital. Emperor Jingzong had the text rewritten so that those who had not been moved closer to Chang'an before could be moved, and Li Shen was thereafter made the secretary general of Jiang Prefecture (江州, in modern Jiujiang, Jiangxi). He was eventually made the prefect of Chu Prefecture (滁洲, in modern Chuzhou, Anhui) and then of Shou Prefecture (壽州, in modern Lu'an, Anhui), and then advisor to the crown prince, with his office at the eastern capital Luoyang.

== During Emperor Wenzong's reign ==
In 833, during the reign of Emperor Jingzong's brother and successor Emperor Wenzong, when Li Deyu was chancellor, Li Shen was made the governor of Zhedong Circuit (浙東, headquartered in modern Shaoxing, Zhejiang) and the prefect of its capital Yue Prefecture (越州). In 835, with their political adversary Li Zongmin as chancellor as well, Li Deyu was removed from his chancellor position due to the collaboration between Li Zongmin and Emperor Wenzong's close associates Li Xun and Zheng Zhu; Li Shen was subsequently made an advisor to Emperor Wenzong's son and crown prince Li Yong, again with his office at Luoyang.

In 836, with the Li Faction figure Zheng Tan as chancellor, Li Shen was made the mayor of Henan Municipality (河南, i.e., the Luoyang region). Later in the year, he was made the military governor of Xuanwu Circuit (宣武, headquartered in modern Kaifeng, Henan) and the prefect of its capital Bian Prefecture (汴州). In 837, when the realm suffered a great locust infestation, Xuanwu Circuit was somehow not affected, and as Emperor Wenzong considered this to be due to the virtues of Li Shen, he issued an edict praising Li Shen.

== During Emperor Wuzong's reign ==
Emperor Wenzong died in 840 and was succeeded by his brother Emperor Wuzong. Soon thereafter, Li Deyu became the leading chancellor, and Li Shen was made the acting military governor of Huainan Circuit (淮南, headquartered in modern Yangzhou, Jiangsu). Li Shen was the military governor when he, in 842, went to Chang'an to pay homage to Emperor Wuzong, and thereafter was made Zhongshu Shilang (中書侍郎), the deputy head of the legislative bureau, and a chancellor de facto with the designation Tong Zhongshu Menxia Pingzhangshi (同中書門下平章事). He was also made the acting director of the treasury. Thereafter, he was created the Duke of Zhao.

In 844, Li Shen suffered a stroke that made it difficult for him to walk. He therefore offered to resign. Emperor Wuzong made him the military governor of Huainan, carrying the Tong Zhongshu Menxia Pingzhangshi title as an honorary title.

In 845, Li Shen accused one of his subordinates, the magistrate of Jiangdu (江都, in modern Yangzhou), Wu Xiang (吳湘), whose uncle Wu Wuling (吳武陵) had long had an adversarial relationship with Li Deyu, of embezzlement and forcibly marrying the daughter of a commoner, Yan Yue (顏悅). Many advisory officials pointed out that the evidence against Wu Xiang was weak, and Emperor Wuzong sent the censors Cui Yuanzao (崔元藻) and Li Chou (李稠) to review the case. Cui and Li Chou reported that Wu Xiang did embezzle funds, but that his father-in-law Yan was not a commoner, nor was the marriage forced. Li Deyu, despite Cui's and Li Chou's report, nevertheless had Wu Xiang executed, and further, retaliating against Cui and Li Chou for their contrary reports, had them demoted and exiled.

== During Emperor Xuānzong's reign ==
Li Shen died in 846, by which time Emperor Wuzong had died and been succeeded by his uncle Emperor Xuānzong. Emperor Xuānzong despised Li Deyu's hold on power, and soon after Emperor Xuānzong's ascension, Li Deyu was removed from his chancellor post. In 847, Wu Xiang's brother Wu Runa (吳汝納) submitted a petition arguing that Wu Xiang was improperly executed and accusing Li Shen and Li Deyu of causing the improper execution. Emperor Xuānzong recalled Cui Yuanzao from exile and had him give an account of the case to the Office of the Imperial Censors, which subsequently submitted a report agreeing that Wu Xiang was improperly executed. As a result, Li Deyu was repeatedly demoted and exiled, eventually dying in exile, while Li Shen was posthumously stripped of three commission certificates.

== Notes and references ==
- Old Book of Tang, vol. 173.
- New Book of Tang, vol. 181.
- Zizhi Tongjian, vols. 241, 243, 246, 248.
