= Yuan Zhen =

Chinese novelist, poet, and politician (779–831)

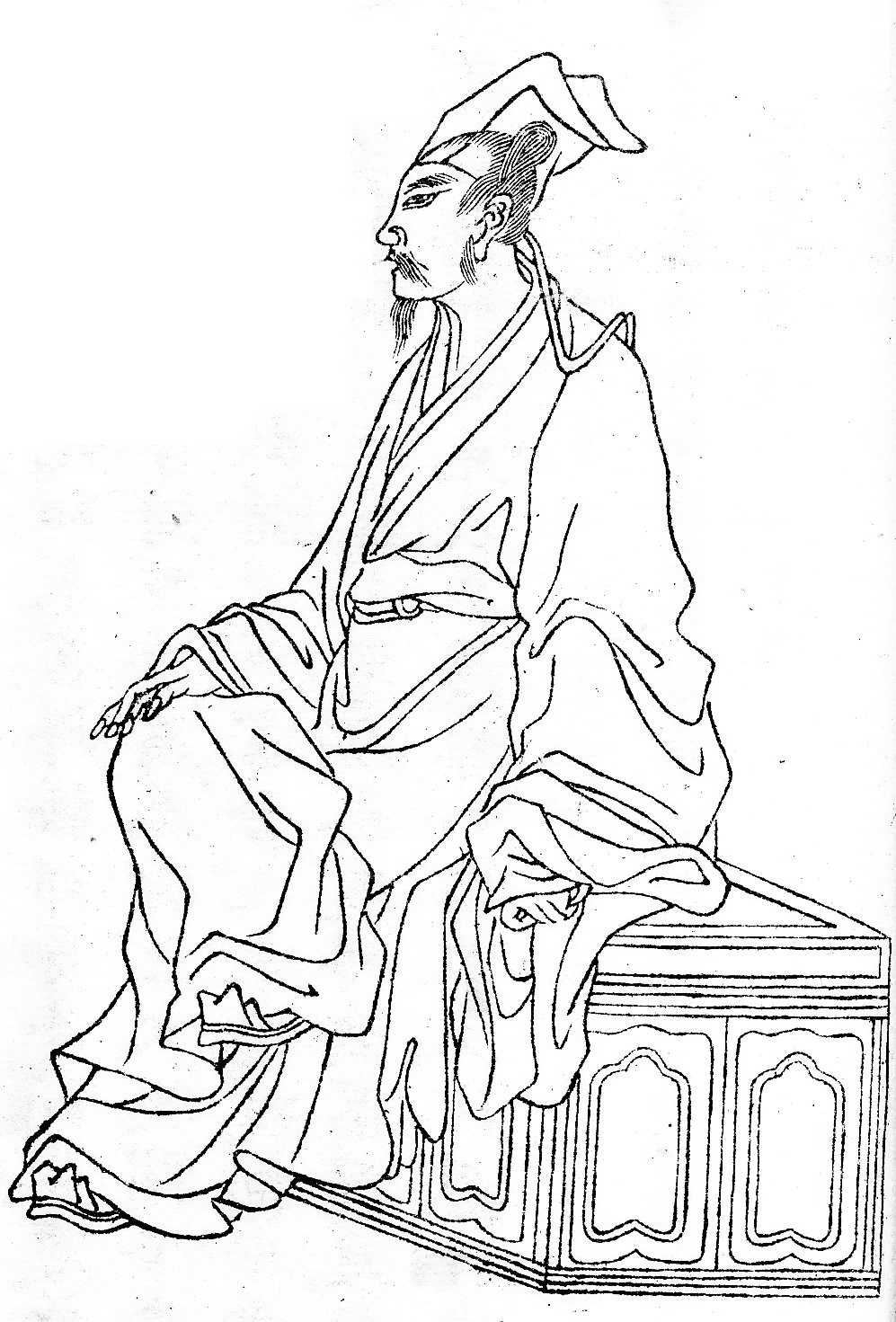
- Chinese: 元稹
Transcriptions
Standard Mandarin
- Hanyu Pinyin: Yuán Zhěn
- Wade–Giles: Yüan^{2} Chen^{3}
- IPA: [ɥɛ̌n ʈʂə̀n]
Yue: Cantonese
- Yale Romanization: Yùhn Ján
- Jyutping: Jyun^{4} Zan^{2}
- IPA: [jyn˩ tsɐn˧˥]
Southern Min
- Hokkien POJ: Goân Chīn

Yuan Zhen (Chinese: 元稹; Wade–Giles: Yüan Chen; 779 – September 2, 831), courtesy name Weizhi (微之), was a Chinese novelist, poet, and politician of the middle Tang dynasty. In prose literature, Yuan Zhen is particularly known for his work Yingying's Biography, which has often been adapted for other treatments, including operatic and musical ones. In poetry, he is remembered for the inclusion of some of his poems by popular anthologies, his verses on exotic topics (such as the former Liangzhou), and for being part of the group of "New Yuefu" poets, which often used poetry as a form of expression and protest, but one potentially subtle enough to avoid the likely repercussions of more direct criticism. The poetic circle in which Yuan Zhen was involved included Bai Juyi, among others. Politically Yuan Zhen was briefly chancellor, during the reign of Emperor Muzong.

A native of Luoyang, Yuan Zhen was a descendant of Northern Wei's imperial family. He lost his father at the age of seven and moved to Fengxiang (鳳翔), near today's Baoji, Shaanxi with his mother Lady Zheng (鄭氏). Yuan began his writings at the age of fifteen. He was a member of Bai Juyi's literary circle and a key figure in the ancient literature revival. He was a friend of Bai Juyi and also of Xue Tao, a courtesan and famous poet who might have been his lover. Bai Juyi and Yuan Zhen made a "Green Mountain pact" to retire together as Taoist recluses once they had accumulated enough funds, but Yuan's untimely death kept them from achieving that dream. In 813, Yuan wrote a grave inscription for Du Fu, which contains some of the earliest known praise for his predecessor's works.

== Background ==
Yuan Zhen was born in 779, around the time of Emperor Dezong's ascension to the throne. He was a 10th-generation descendant of Tuoba Shiyiqian, the grandfather of Northern Wei's founder Emperor Daowu, who was posthumously honored Emperor Zhaocheng after Northern Wei's founding. Yuan Zhen's male ancestor line was renamed Yuan, from Tuoba, when Emperor Xiaowen changed Xianbei names to Han names in 496. Subsequently, ancestors of Yuan Zhen's served as officials of the Sui dynasty and Tang dynasty. His grandfather Yuan Fei (元悱) served as a county secretary general, while his father Yuan Kuan (元寬) served as a low-level official at the ministry of justice, as well as secretary to an imperial prince.

Yuan Kuan died when Yuan Zhen was seven, and Yuan Zhen was raised by his mother Lady Zheng, who was considered an intelligent woman. As the household was poor, she did not send Yuan Zhen to school, but taught him to read and write herself. It was said that Yuan became capable of writing at age eight, and at age 14 passed the imperial examination for understanding two Confucian classics. At age 23, he was made a copyeditor at the Palace Library.

== During Emperor Xianzong's reign ==
In 806, when Yuan Zhen was 27, during the reign of Emperor Dezong's grandson Emperor Xianzong, Yuan underwent a special imperial examination before Emperor Xianzong dealing with strategic thinking, and when the list of 18 examinees who passed the examination was announced, Yuan was ranked first — in a group that included such individuals as Bai Juyi, Dugu Yu (獨孤郁), Xiao Mian, and Shen Chuanshi (沈傳師). As a result, Yuan was made You Shiyi (右拾遺), a junior advisor at the legislative bureau of government (中書省).

Yuan had an outspoken personality, and after being put into an advisorial post, he started submitting suggestions to Emperor Xianzong. In particular, because the officials Wang Shuwen and Wang Pi, who dominated the court of Emperor Xianzong's father Emperor Shunzong — who had previously served as Emperor Shunzong's staff members while Emperor Shunzong was crown prince — were at that time denounced as frivolous and power-hungry, Yuan submitted an essay detailing what he saw as qualifications that the crown prince's and other imperial princes' staff members should have, and Emperor Xianzong was impressed upon reading it. Yuan further submitted proposals involving the defense of the northwestern borders with the Tibetan and Uyghur Empires. Emperor Xianzong, in response, summoned him and requested opinions on strategies to take there. As a result, though, the ruling officials at the time were jealous of Yuan, and they had him sent out of the capital Chang'an to serve as the sheriff of Henan County (河南), one of the two counties making up the eastern capital Luoyang. Yuan subsequently left governmental service for some time while observing a mourning period after his mother's death. Once the mourning period was over, he was recalled to governmental service, to serve as Jiancha Yushi (監察御史), a mid-level imperial censor.

In 809, Yuan was on a mission to Dongchuan Circuit (東川, headquartered in modern Mianyang, Sichuan), when he submitted accusations that the deceased former military governor (Jiedushi) of Dongchuan, Yan Li (嚴礪), had collected taxes illegally and improperly seized the property of 88 households. As a result, the seven prefectural prefects who served under Yan were all punished. However, among the ruling officials, there were those who had deep friendships with Yan, and as a result of this incident, Yuan was sent out of the capital to serve at Dongtai (东台), the Luoyang branch of the office of the imperial censors. While at Luoyang, he continued to pursue various officials for misconduct, including the caning of a county magistrate by the governor of Zhexi Circuit (浙西, headquartered in modern Zhenjiang, Jiangsu), Han Gao (韓皐), leading to the magistrate's death, and the improper use of imperial messenger posts by the military governor of Wuning Circuit (武寧, headquartered in modern Xuzhou, Jiangsu), Wang Shao (王紹), to host the casket of the recently deceased eunuch monitor of the Wuning army. Meanwhile, when the mayor of Henan Municipality (i.e., the Luoyang region, not only the two counties), Fang Shi (房式), was accused of improper conduct, Yuan issued an order suspending Fang from office pending investigations. However, after investigations, Fang was only punished by being stripped of one month of salary, and Yuan was recalled to Chang'an. While stopping at the imperial messenger post at Fushui (敷水, in modern Weinan, Shaanxi), Yuan got into a dispute with an imperial eunuch messenger — variously reported as either Liu Shiyuan (劉士元) (by the Old Book of Tang) or Qiu Shiliang (by the New Book of Tang), in which the eunuch, as a result of the dispute, hit Yuan's face and injured him — Emperor Xianzong ruled that Yuan had overstepped his authorities as censor and demoted him to serve as the logistics officer at Jiangling Municipality (江陵, in modern Jingzhou, Hubei), despite defenses submitted on his behalf by Li Jiang, Cui Qun, and Bai.

While at Jiangling, Yuan wrote many poems, and his style and Bai's were both popular and referred by the populace as Yuanhe Style (元和體) — Yuanhe being Emperor Xianzong's era name. The eunuch monitor of Jingnan Circuit (荊南, headquartered at Jiangling), Cui Tanjun (崔潭峻), was impressed by Yuan's talents and did not treat him as a subordinate, but rather with great respect; he also often collected Yuan's poems and recited them. Meanwhile, sometime thereafter, Yuan was made the military advisor to the prefect of Tong Prefecture (通州, in modern Nantong, Jiangsu), while Bai was made the military governor of Jiang Prefecture (江州, in modern Nanchang, Jiangxi). Despite the distance between the two, they often wrote poems to each other, which often ran 30 to 50 lines, sometimes up to 100 lines. The people of the Yangtze River region became impressed by their poems and often read and studied them. Many of Yuan's poems showed his sadness at being exiled from the capital.

In 819, by which time Yuan was serving as the secretary general of Guo Prefecture (虢州, in modern Sanmenxia, Henan), he was recalled to Chang'an to serve as Shanbu Yuanwailang (膳部員外郎), a low-level official at the ministry of rites (禮部, Libu). Then-chancellor Linghu Chu, himself a talented writer, had long been impressed by Yuan's literary abilities, requested that he submit his writings to Linghu. Yuan did so, and the writings impressed LInghu greatly, comparing him to the Liu Song dynasty poets Bao Zhao (鮑照) and Xie Lingyun. Meanwhile, Emperor Xianzong's son and crown prince Li Heng, who had heard his concubines recite Yuan's poetry and referring to Yuan as "Savant Yuan" (元才子), was impressed.

== During Emperor Muzong's and Emperor Jingzong's reigns ==
In 820, by which time Li Heng was emperor (as Emperor Muzong), Cui Tanjun was recalled to Chang'an, and he offered to Emperor Muzong, as a gift, a collection of over 100 poems by Yuan Zhen. Emperor Muzong was pleased, and asked Cui where Yuan was at that point, and Cui replied that Yuan was serving in an office lacking authority. That same day, Emperor Muzong promoted Yuan to be Cibu Langzhong (祠部郎中), a supervisorial official at the ministry of rites, and further put him in charge of drafting edicts for Emperor Muzong. However, because this was an irregular promotion, Yuan was looked down by his colleagues. On one occasion, when many imperial officials were gathering to eat melons, there were flies which gathered on the melons. Wu Ruheng (武儒衡) waved his fan to chase away the flies, and made the double entendre, "Where did you come from? Why did you come here?" This caused many of Wu's colleagues to be shocked and lose composure, but Wu did not. Nevertheless, Yuan's poetry continued to become increasingly popular at Chang'an, such that the people were rushing to learn it. Soon thereafter, Yuan was made chief imperial scholar (翰林承旨學士, Hanlin Xueshi) as well as Zhongshu Sheren (中書舍人), a mid-level official at the legislative bureau. Because of the friendship that Yuan had with Cui, the other eunuchs were also trying to become friendly with Yuan, particularly one of the directors of palace communications (Shumishi), Wei Hongjian (魏弘簡).

In 821, Yuan was involved in an incident that was considered one of the precipitating incidents of the coming Niu-Li Factional Struggles. At that time, both Yuan and imperial scholar Li Deyu were involved in power struggles with Yuan's fellow Zhongshu Sheren Li Zongmin. Meanwhile, Li Zongmin's junior colleague at the legislative bureau, Yang Rushi (楊汝士) and the deputy minister of rites (禮部侍郎, Libu Shilang) Qian Hui (錢徽) were in charge of overseeing the imperial examinations. The military governor Duan Wenchang (a former chancellor) and the imperial scholar Li Shen both made secret pleas to Qian for certain examinees. However, when the results were announced, the examinees that Duan and Li Shen recommended were not given passing results, while among those passing the examinations were Zheng Lang, the brother of the examination bureau (門下省, Menxia Sheng) official Zheng Tan; Pei Zhuan (裴譔) the son of the military governor Pei Du (also a former chancellor); Li Zongmin's son-in-law Su Chao (蘇巢); and Yang Rushi's brother Yang Yinshi (楊殷士). This thus brought a popular uproar, and Duan submitted a report accusing Yang Rushi and Qian of being unfair. When Emperor Muzong requested opinions from the imperial scholars, Li Deyu, Yuan, and Li Shen all agreed with Duan's opinion. Emperor Muzong thus ordered Li Zongmin's colleague Wang Qi (王起) to conduct a re-examination, while demoting Qian, Li Zongmin, and Yang Rushi to be prefectural prefects and deposing 10 of the examinees selected by Qian and Yang Rushi. This was said to be the start of some 40 years of struggles between Li Deyu and his associates (known as the Li Faction) and Li Zongmin and his associates (known as the Niu Faction, named after Li Zongmin's ally Niu Sengru).

Meanwhile, Pei Du was leading a campaign against rebel generals Zhu Kerong and Wang Tingcou north of the Yellow River. It was said that, while Yuan had no resentment toward Pei personally, he wanted to be chancellor and was fearful that if Pei were victorious, Pei would be recalled and would again dominate the court, and therefore Yuan, as well as his ally Wei Hongjian, were interfering with requests that Pei was making of Emperor Muzong during the campaign. Pei, incensed, submitted a harshly worded accusation against Yuan and Wei. Emperor Muzong was displeased with Pei's accusations, but as Pei was a prominent statesman, placated Pei by demoting Wei to be the director of the imperial armory and Yuan to be the deputy minister of public works (工部侍郎, Gongbu Shilang), relieving Yuan of his position as imperial scholar. However, it was said that Emperor Muzong continued to trust Yuan greatly, despite removing him from his imperial scholar post. Indeed, soon thereafter, after the campaign ended (when the imperial government capitulated to Zhu and Wang by making them military governors), Yuan was made a chancellor with the title Tong Zhongshu Menxia Pingzhangshi (同中書門下平章事). (It was said that the capitulation was advocated by Yuan, who wanted to relieve Pei of his military command.)

Meanwhile, during the campaign against Zhu and Wang, Wang had put Niu Yuanyi (牛元翼), a general loyal to the imperial government, under siege at Shen Prefecture (深州, in modern Hengshui, Hebei). Yu Fang (于方), an advisor to an imperial prince, who wanted to submit an extraordinary suggestion to gain a promotion, suggested to Yuan that Yu's friends Wang Zhao (王昭) and Yu Youming (于友明) be sent to Wang Tingcou's Chengde Circuit (成德, headquartered in modern Shijiazhuang, Hebei) to try to persuade Wang Tingcou's officers to lift the siege on Shen Prefecture. Yuan accepted the idea, and, as part of the plan, gave Wang Zhao and Yuan Youming some 20 commission certificates to give them to Wang Tingcou's officers. A man named Li Shang (李賞) heard of the plan, but misinterpreted this as a plot by Yuan and Yu Fang to assassinate Pei. He reported this to Pei, but Pei took no action. He then reported it to the Left Shence Army (左神策軍). After Emperor Muzong received report of this, he had Han Gao investigate the matter. After the investigation was complete, it was concluded that there was no evidence that Yuan intended to assassinate Pei, but as a result, both Pei (who by this point had returned to Chang'an and was again serving as chancellor) and Yuan were relieved of their chancellor posts, less than four months after Yuan was made chancellor. Yuan was sent out of the capital to serve as the prefect of Tong Prefecture (同州, in modern Weinan). When a number of advisorial officials subsequently submitted objections that Yuan's punishment was too light, Emperor Muzong stripped Yuan of one of his ceremonial posts as the director of Changchun Palace (長春宮, in Tong Prefecture). While the investigations were still ongoing, the mayor of Jingzhao Municipality (京兆, i.e., the Chang'an region), Liu Zungu (劉遵古), was putting Yuan's house under constant guard. When Yuan complained about this, Emperor Muzong punished Liu.

After Yuan served for two years at Tong Prefecture, he was made the governor (觀察使, Guanchashi) of Zhedong Circuit (浙東, headquartered in modern Shaoxing, Zhejiang) as well as the prefect of its capital prefecture Yue Prefecture (越州). Yuan retained a staff that was also talented in literature, and they took tours of the picturesque locations of the circuit three or four times per month. They also often wrote poems. His deputy Dou Gong (竇鞏), in particular, became a famed poet himself, and they often wrote poems to each other. Meanwhile, while at Zhedong, Yuan also became known for being corrupt and gathering wealth. He served there for eight years, including the entire brief reign of Emperor Muzong's son Emperor Jingzong.

== During Emperor Wenzong's reign ==
In 829, by which time Emperor Jingzong's brother Emperor Wenzong was emperor, Yuan Zhen was recalled to Chang'an to serve as Shangshu Zuo Cheng (尚書左丞), one of the secretaries general of the executive bureau (尚書省, Shangshu Sheng). He tried to reorganize the bureau, and he expelled seven officials under him who had poor reputations. However, as Yuan himself was not known for exemplary ethics, he did not receive much support from other officials. When the chancellor Wang Bo died in 830, Yuan tried to use his connections to again become chancellor, but was unable to do so. Instead, he was sent out to Wuchang Circuit (武昌, headquartered in modern Wuhan, Hubei) to serve as its military governor and the prefect of its capital prefecture E Prefecture (鄂州). He became ill suddenly in fall 831 and died within a day of falling ill. He was given posthumous honors. As his son Yuan Daohu (元道護) was then only two years old, his funeral was hosted by his cousin Yuan Ji (元積). He left a collection of 100 volumes of poems, draft edicts, commemorative texts, and essays. He also compiled a 300-volume work collecting ancient and contemporary legal rulings.

== Poetry ==
As an official, Yuan Zhen pursued his poetic activities under during Emperor Muzong's and Emperor Jingzong's reigns, both his own taking an active interest in the works of other poets.

Yuan Zhen was part of the New Yuefu Movement, which involved poets interested in reviving some of the aspects of the yuefu style folk ballad verse popular during the Han dynasty, with an interest in poetry as a form of political and societal critique. The group includes Bai Juyi (considered to be their leader), Zhang Ji, and Wang Jian.

Yuan Zhen had four of his poems selected for inclusion in the famous poetry anthology Three Hundred Tang Poems. These were translated by Witter Bynner with the following titles:

- "An Elegy I"
- "An Elegy II"
- "An Elegy III"
- "The Summer Palace"

The three "Elegies" are laments for his wife who died young.

== Prose ==
The Biography of Ying-ying is one of the most widely read and adapted chuanqi, or short stories in the classical language. It has been translated by James Hightower ("Yüan Chen and 'The Story of YIng-ying'" HJAS 33 (1973): 90–123), Arthur Waley (available in the Anthology of Chinese Literature by Cyril Birch, vol. I. (ISBN 0-8021-5038-1). An online translation by Patrick Moran includes the Chinese text. here.

== See also ==
- Classical Chinese poetry

== Works cited ==
- Yuan Zhen 2005 Encyclopædia Britannica, copyrighted 1994-2005
- Bian, Xiaoxuan, "Yuan Zhen". Encyclopedia of China (Chinese Literature Edition), 1st ed.
- Old Book of Tang, vol. 166.
- New Book of Tang, vol. 174.
- Zizhi Tongjian, 237, 238, 241, 242.
- Ueki, Hisayuki; Uno, Naoto; Matsubara, Akira (1999). "Shijin to Shi no Shōgai (Gen Jin/Shin)". In Matsuura, Tomohisa (ed.). Kanshi no Jiten 漢詩の事典 (in Japanese). Tokyo: Taishūkan Shoten. pp. 119–120. OCLC 41025662.
