= Zheng Lang =

9th-century Chinese chancellor

Zheng Lang (Chinese: 鄭朗; died 857), courtesy name Yourong (有融), was a Chinese historian and politician during the Tang dynasty, who served as a chancellor during the reign of Emperor Xuānzong.

== Background and early career ==
It is not known when Zheng Lang was born. He came from a prominent family, as both his father Zheng Xunyu and brother Zheng Tan served as chancellors during their respective careers. Zheng Lang himself passed the imperial examinations in the Jinshi class in 821, during the reign of Emperor Muzong, by which time Zheng Xunyu was deceased but Zheng Tan was already a prominent official—but his passage, as well as the passages of several other examinees related to prominent officials, including Pei Du's son Pei Zhuan (裴譔), Li Zongmin's son-in-law Su Chao (蘇巢), and Yang Yinshi (楊殷士) the brother of Yang Rushi (楊汝士), who was one of the lead examiners, were embroiled in controversy as the officials Duan Wenchang, Li Deyu, Yuan Zhen, and Li Shen, accused the examiners Yang Rushi and Qian Hui (錢徽) of being unfair in their decisions. As a result, Emperor Muzong ordered a reexamination, while demoting Qian, Li Zongmin, and Yang Rushi, as well as the 10 examinees who passed based on perceived influence. This incident was considered to have precipitated the subsequent decades-long Niu-Li Factional Struggles.

As a result of this incident, Zheng Lang was not able to remain at Chang'an to start his official service, but instead served as a staff member of the military governor (jiedushi) Liu Gongchuo (柳公綽) at Shannan East Circuit (山南東道, headquartered in modern Xiangfan, Hubei). Zheng was eventually recalled to Chang'an to serve as You Shiyi (右拾遺), a low-level advisory official at the legislative bureau of government (中書省, Zhongshu Sheng).

== During Emperor Wenzong's reign ==
During the Kaicheng era (836–840) of Emperor Muzong's son Emperor Wenzong, Zheng Lang was made an imperial chronicler (起居郎, Qiju Lang). On one occasion, after Emperor Wenzong and the chancellors discussed the virtue of frugality, Emperor Wenzong saw Zheng taking notes, as an imperial chronicler was supposed to do. After the meeting, Emperor Wenzong requested to see the records. Zheng initially resisted, pointing out that if the emperor were free to read the records of the imperial chroniclers, the imperial chroniclers would feel constrained about what they could write and would not be able to be impartial, but after Emperor Wenzong insisted, stating that he wanted to see so that he could correct himself if necessary, Zheng submitted the records for his review. Zheng was later made Kaogong Langzhong (考功郎中), a supervisory official at the ministry of civil service affairs (吏部, Libu). In 839, he was made Jianyi Daifu (諫議大夫), a high-level advisory official.

== During Emperor Wuzong's reign ==
In 842, by which time Emperor Wenzong's brother Emperor Wuzong was emperor, there was an occasion when Zheng Lang, still then serving as Jianyi Daifu, along with his colleague Gao Shaoyi (高少逸), advised Emperor Wuzong that he was spending too much time in hunting. Emperor Wuzong thanked them and told the chancellors about their advice. He later served as an imperial attendant (給事中, Jishizhong), then the prefect of Hua Prefecture (華州, in modern Weinan, Shaanxi), then the deputy minister of census (戶部侍郎, Hubu Shilang), also serving as the director of taxation.

== During Emperor Xuānzong's reign ==
During the reign of Emperor Wuzong's uncle Emperor Xuānzong, Zheng Lang was made the military governor of Yiwu Circuit (義武, headquartered in modern Baoding, Hebei), as well as the prefect of its capital Ding Prefecture (定州). He was later transferred to Xuanwu Circuit (宣武, headquartered in modern Kaifeng, Henan), and also served as the prefect of its capital Bian Prefecture (汴州). He was later recalled to Chang'an to serve as the minister of public works (工部尚書, Gongbu Shangshu) and the director of finances. He was then made the chief imperial censor (御史大夫, Yushi Daifu). In 856, he was further given the designation Tong Zhongshu Menxia Pingzhangshi (同中書門下平章事), making him a chancellor de facto. He was also made Zhongshu Shilang (中書侍郎), the deputy head of the examination bureau, as well as a senior scholar at Jixian Hall (集賢殿), in charge of editing the imperial history. He resigned the chancellor position on account of illness in 857, and was made a senior advisor to the Crown Prince. He died later that year and was given posthumous honors.

== Notes and references ==
- Old Book of Tang, vol. 173.
- New Book of Tang, vol. 165.
- Zizhi Tongjian, vols. 241, 246, 249.
