= Pei Min =

Early 8th century general skilled in archery and swordplay

- 裴旻
- In office early 8th century (Kaiyuan era)
- Monarch: Emperor Xuanzong of Tang

Personal details
- Born: c. 8th century
- Died: c. 8th century
- Occupation: Military general

Pei Min
- Chinese: 裴旻
Transcriptions
Standard Mandarin
- Hanyu Pinyin: Péi mín

Pei Min (fl. early 8th century)(裴旻) was a Chinese military general during the Kaiyuan era. He participated in battles against the Xiongnu, the Tibetan Empire, and Khitans. He is known as the Sword Saint (剑圣) as he was very skilled in swordplay. He also was said to be a great archer and to have killed thirty-one tigers in a single day. Emperor Wenzong of Tang, in an imperial decree, included Pei Min in the "Three Wonders of the Tang Dynasty," which refer to Pei Min's swordplay, Li Bai's poetry, and Zhang Xu’s calligraphy.

== Accounts about Pei Min ==
It is said that Li Bai once wanted to learn swordplay from Pei Min. Also, he supposedly "threw the sword into the clouds, more than 109 feet (10 Zhàng) high, as lightning struck down, leading his hands he bore it with the sheath, in front of a thousand spectators, trembling and shuddering.

At one point in time, Pei Min was an envoy to the Long Hua Army and guarded Beiping (now Beijing).

Pei Min was good at archery and shot thirty-one tigers in one day. An old man said to him, "These look like tigers, but yet are not. If a general met a real tiger, he would be helpless." Pei proceeded to ask "Then where is the real tiger?" The old man told him "Thirty kilometers north, there is." When Pei Min arrived there, he saw a small, but fierce, tiger. Its roared shattered rocks on the ground. His horse got away and his bow fell. From that day onwards, Pei Min did not shoot tigers again.

== Poetry about Pei Min ==
The following is the poem "Gift to General Pei" by Yan Zhenqing:

〈贈裴將軍〉顏真卿

大君制六合，猛將清九垓。
戰馬若龍虎，騰陵何壯哉。
將軍臨八荒，烜赫耀英材。
劍舞若遊電，隨風縈且回。
登高望天山，白雲正崔巍。
入陣破驕虜，威名雄震雷。
一射百馬倒，再射萬夫開。
匈奴不敢敵，相呼歸去來。
功成報天子，可以畫麟臺。

It roughly translates to:

"Gift to General Pei" by Yan Zhenqing

The great ruler controls the six hemispheres, the fierce general clears the sky.
The war horses are like dragons and tigers, the tomb is strong.
The general is in the eight directions, his talent shines brightly.
The sword dances just like lightning, lingering then returning to the wind.
Looking up at the heavenly mountains, the white clouds are majestic.
He broke the enemy in battle, and his fame shook thunder.
One shot and a hundred horses fell, another shot and ten thousand people parted.
The Xiongnu did not dare to fight, calling out to each other to retreat.

The job done was reported to the son of heaven, now one can paint the Lintai Pavilion.
