= Wei Chuhou =

Chinese chancellor (773–829)

Wei Chuhou (韋處厚) (773 – January 29, 829), né Wei Chun (韋淳), courtesy name Dezai (德載), formally the Duke of Lingchang (靈昌公), was an official of the Chinese Tang dynasty, serving as a chancellor during the reign of Emperor Wenzong.

== Background ==
Wei Chun was born in 773, during the reign of Emperor Daizong. His family was from the Tang dynasty capital municipality Jingzhao (京兆, in modern Xi'an, Shaanxi) – i.e., the Chang'an region. His family claimed original ancestry from a line of officials of the Han dynasty, Cao Wei, Jin dynasty (266–420), Later Yan, Northern Wei, Northern Zhou, Sui dynasty, and Tang, although Wei Chun's male-line ancestors, for several generations prior to his father Wei Wan (韋萬), were not listed to have any official titles. Wei Wan served as a staff member for a military governor (Jiedushi) of Jingnan Circuit (荊南, headquartered in modern Jingzhou, Hubei).

At some point, Wei Chun changed his name to Wei Chuhou due to naming taboo for Emperor Daizong's great-grandson Emperor Xianzong (Li Chun) – although it is not clear whether Emperor Xianzong was then emperor. It was said that Wei Chuhou was an expressive child, and he was filially pious toward his stepmother. When observing mourning periods when his father and stepmother died, he lived at their tomb. After the mourning period was over, he travelled throughout the Chang'an region. It was said that he was well-learned in the Five Classics and the histories, and that he was talented in writing.

== During Emperor Xianzong's reign ==
Early in Emperor Xianzong's Yuanhe era (806–821), Wei Chuhou passed the imperial examinations in the Jinshi (進士) class, and further passed a special examination for those considered intelligent and upright in their behavior. He was thereafter made Xiaoshu Lang (校書郎), a copyeditor at the Palace Library. When the chancellor Pei Ji was put in charge of editing imperial history, Pei retained him to participate in the project in addition to his regular office, and while doing so, he went through serving as the sheriff of Xianyang County (咸陽, in modern Xi'an) and then You Shiyi (右拾遺), a low-level consultant at the legislative bureau of government (中書省, Zhongshu Sheng). While serving in this editing role, he participated in the editing of 50 volumes of historical records of Emperor Xianzong's grandfather Emperor Dezong, and his accounts were considered credibly-written.

Thereafter, Wei Chuhou was promoted to be Zuo Bujue (左補闕), a consultant at the examination bureau (門下省, Menxia Sheng), and then successively as Libu Yuanwailang (禮部員外郎), a low-level official at the ministry of rites (禮部, Lǐbu) and Kaogong Yuanwailang (考功員外郎), a low-level official at the ministry of civil service affairs (吏部, Lìbu, note different tone than the ministry of rites). He was respected by the chancellor Wei Guanzhi. As a result, however, when Wei Guanzhi was demoted in 816 due to his disagreements with Emperor Xianzong on Emperor Xianzong's campaigns against warlords, Wei Chuhou was sent out of the capital to serve the prefect of Kai Prefecture (開州, in modern Chongqing). He was later recalled to serve as Hubu Langzhong (戶部郎中), a supervisorial official at the ministry of census (戶部, Hubu), and thereafter, while serving at that position, became in charge of drafting imperial edicts.

== During Emperor Muzong's reign ==
After Emperor Xianzong died in 820 and was succeeded by his son Emperor Muzong, Emperor Muzong was impressed by Wei Chuhou's scholarship, and he made Wei a deputy imperial scholar (翰林侍講學士, Hanlin Shijiang Xueshi). Wei was also made Jianyi Daifu (諫議大夫), and later Zhongshu Sheren (中書舍人), a mid-level official at the legislative bureau, while retaining his status as deputy imperial scholar. As Wei considered Emperor Muzong to be neglectful with his studies, he, along with his colleague Lu Sui, wrote a 20-volume summary of the I Ching, Classic of History, Shi Jing, Spring and Autumn Annals, Classic of Rites, Xiao Jing, and Analects, entitled, the Guiding Words from the Six Classics (六經法言). Emperor Muzong appreciated the work, and rewarded them with gold and silk. At that time, Emperor Muzong's favorite official Zhang Pingshu (張平叔) advocated that the state-supervised salt monopoly be further converted into a state-run business (with even stricter control by the state), believing that this would have great economic benefits. Zhang submitted a petition with 18 points, and Emperor Muzong tentatively indicated that he agreed with it, but distributed the petition among the officials for comment. Wei wrote a 10-point response rebutting Zhang, and when Emperor Muzong showed Wei's response to Zhang, Zhang, having no response to Wei, withdrew his proposal. As, at that time, the chronicles of Emperor Xianzong's reign had not yet been edited, Emperor Muzong put Wei and Lu in charge of the project, with each of them on duty on alternate days. Wei was also made acting deputy minister of defense (兵部侍郎, Bingbu Shilang).

== During Emperor Jingzong's reign ==
In 824, Emperor Muzong died and was succeeded by his son Emperor Jingzong. After Emperor Jingzong's ascension, the chancellor Li Fengji became very powerful. Li Fengji was resentful of the official Li Shen, and thus falsely accused Li Shen of not supporting Emperor Jingzong and instead wanting to support Emperor Muzong's brother Li Cong (李悰) the Prince of Shen. Li Shen was exiled, and Li Fengji further tried to have Emperor Jingzong order Li Shen's death. Wei Chuhou, who passed the imperial examinations in the same year as Li Shen, submitted a defense of Li Shen, pointing out that there was no real evidence of Li Shen's alleged crime and that, as Li Shen was a close advisor of Emperor Muzong's, Emperor Jingzong should not be acting against him so quick after Emperor Muzong's death. When Emperor Jingzong subsequently discovered a petition in the archives in which Li Shen sought to have Emperor Jingzong created crown prince, Li Shen was spared.

Later in the year, after Emperor Jingzong was shocked that the warlord Wang Tingcou (the military governor of Chengde Circuit (成德, headquartered in modern Shijiazhuang, Hebei)) had slaughtered the family of the deceased general Niu Yuanyi (牛元翼), who had remained loyal to the imperial government and who had resisted Wang, Wei pointed out that the former chancellor Pei Du, then serving as the military governor of Shannan East Circuit (山南東道, headquartered in modern Xiangfan, Hubei), had great contributions in Emperor Xianzong's campaigns against warlords and should have been allowed to remain chancellor. Emperor Jingzong did not recall Pei at that time, but did, at Wei's suggestion, bestow the honorary chancellor designation of Tong Zhongshu Menxia Pingzhangshi (同中書門下平章事) on Pei.

Soon thereafter, Wei was made deputy minister of defense, and when he met Emperor Jingzong, who was then spending much time in feasts and games, to thank him, stated, "Your subject has committed a great crime. I beg for my life." Emperor Jingzong responded, "What are you talking about?" Wei responded:

Previously, I was serving as a consultant, but I did not risk my life in pleading with the Deceased Emperor [(i.e., Emperor Muzong)] to stop his drinking and sexual indulgence; he therefore did not live long. But why I did not risk my life was that at that time, Your Imperial Majesty was already at the Spring Palace [(i.e., the palace of the Crown Prince)] and was already 14. But at this time, the imperial son is only an infant. How can I not risk my own life now?

Emperor Jingzong appreciated his advice and awarded him with colored silk and silver vessels.

Li Fengji continued to resent Li Shen, and after Emperor Jingzong issued another general pardon in summer 825, initially, the edict that Li Fengji drafted allows exiled officials who had previously moved toward the capital be allowed to be moved again — but intentionally failed to mention officials who had not previously been moved, to prevent Li Shen from being moved. When Wei pointed this out, Emperor Jingzong revised the edict to allow such movements, and Li Shen thus was moved closer to the capital, from his then-post as the military advisor to the prefect of Duan Prefecture (端州, in modern Zhaoqing, Guangdong), to serve as the secretary general of Jiang Prefecture (江州, in modern Jiujiang, Jiangxi).

Around the new year 827, Emperor Jingzong was assassinated by a group of eunuchs and imperial guard officers, led by the eunuch Liu Keming (劉克明), who were resentful of his harsh temper. Liu tried to have Emperor Muzong's brother Li Wu the Prince of Jiàng made emperor, but another group of eunuchs, led by the powerful eunuch Wang Shoucheng, attacked Liu's group and slaughtered them. Wang was intending to make Emperor Jingzong's brother Li Han the Prince of Jiāng (note different tone) made emperor, but did not know how to explain what had happened to the people. He consulted Wei, who argued that nothing should be hidden from the public, and that the entire incident should be explained. He further outlined the ceremony for Li Han to take the throne — for a declaration to be issued in Li Han's name explaining how the incident had occurred and how the conspirators had been destroyed; for the officials then to submit three successive petitions asking Li Han to take the throne; and then for Emperor Muzong's mother Grand Empress Dowager Guo to issue an edict ordering Li Han to take the throne. Wang followed Wei's suggestions, and Li Han subsequently took the throne (as Emperor Wenzong).

== During Emperor Wenzong's reign ==
After Emperor Wenzong took the throne, Wei Chuhou, for his contributions during the crisis, was made the deputy head of the legislative bureau (中書侍郎, Zhongshu Shilang) and made a chancellor with the designation Tong Zhongshu Menxia Pingzhangshi. He was also put in charge of editing the imperial history, given the honorary title Yinqing Guanglu Daifu (銀青光祿大夫), and created the Duke of Lingchang. It was said that while serving as chancellor, Wei focused on dealing with the problems at hand and had little regard for his own welfare. During Emperor Dezong's reign, then-chancellor Qi Kang had abolished the prefectural-level office of Biejia (別駕, chief advisor to the prefect) as unnecessary, and persons who would have ordinarily been made Biejia were instead kept as advisory officials with no real authorities at the capital. Further, during and after Emperor Xianzong's campaigns, officers who had contributions during the battles were often kept at the capital to serve on imperial princes' staffs; as a result, these highly decorated officials crowded the imperial meetings and were often left with nothing to do. Wei restored the Biejia office for 60 prefectures and thus relieved the crowding at these imperial meetings.

Emperor Wenzong, initially, was diligent in listening to the advice of the imperial officials, but he was indecisive, and it was often the case that after he had made a decision, he would change it. In summer 827, Wei objected to this situation and offered to resign; Emperor Wenzong apologized and did not accept his resignation.

As of 827, Emperor Wenzong was waging a general campaign against the rebel general Li Tongjie, who had seized Henghai Circuit (橫海, headquartered in modern Cangzhou, Hebei) after the death of his father Li Quanlüe (李全略), who served as military governor. Emperor Wenzong ordered the nearby circuits to contribute soldiers to the campaign, but Shi Xiancheng the military governor of Weibo Circuit (魏博, headquartered in modern Handan, Hebei), one of whose children was married to a child of Li Quanlüe's, was secretly aiding Li Tongjie with food supplies. Pei Du, who was by then again chancellor, was unaware of this and believed Shi to be faithful, but on one occasion when Shi sent a messenger to Chang'an, Wei stated to the messenger:

The Duke of Jin [(i.e., Pei)] swore the faithfulness of your military governor by the 100 lives of his household, but I, Wei Chuhou, do not believe you. I will watch your acts carefully, and there will be laws dealing with this.

When the messenger relayed this to Shi, Shi became apprehensive and did not dare to aid Li Tongjie any further. Subsequently, when one of the military governors acting for the imperial cause, Li Zaiyi the military governor of Lulong Circuit (盧龍, headquartered in modern Beijing), was fighting against Li Tongjie and his ally Wang Tingcou the military governor of Chengde Circuit (成德, headquartered in modern Shijiazhuang, Hebei), his soldiers often killed the Henghai and Chengde soldiers that they captured. Wei wrote a letter to Li Zaiyi rebuking him for the behavior, and Li Zaiyi obeyed his order. Thereafter, the captured Henghai and Chengde soldiers were usually spared.

It was said that Wei lived frugally at home, often dressing like an ordinary scholar rather than a chancellor, and was hard-working. He was also said to be stern, such that his staff members did not dare to make private requests of him. He focused on commissioning officials with talent, such that he was willing to overlook character flaws or past inappropriate behavior — and for this was both praised and criticized. He was a fervent believer of Buddhism, particularly later in his life. He had more than 10,000 volumes in his collection of books, and in most of them, he wrote notes by hand. As the lead editor of the imperial histories, he began the project of chronicling Emperor Xianzong's reign, and while he did not see it to its completion, it was said that he laid the framework. On January 29, 829, he was attending a meeting with the other chancellors and Emperor Wenzong, when he suddenly stated, "Your subject is ill." He withdrew from Emperor Wenzong's presence. Emperor Wenzong had eunuchs accompany him back to his mansion. He died that night, and was given posthumous honors. It was said that because of his capability as chancellor, the public mourned his death.

== Notes and references ==
- Old Book of Tang, vol. 159.
- New Book of Tang, vol. 142.
- Zizhi Tongjian, vols. 239, 243.
