= Lu Sui =

Lu Sui (路隨 or 路隋) (776 – August 16, 835), courtesy name Nanshi (南式), was an official of the Chinese Tang dynasty, serving as a chancellor during the reign of Emperor Wenzong.

== Background ==
Lu Sui was born in 776, during the reign of Emperor Daizong. His ancestors were originally from Yangping (陽平, in modern Hanzhong, Shanxi). His great-great-grandfather Lu Jie (路節) served on staff of Li Zhen the Prince of Yue (an elder brother of Emperor Daizong's great-great-grandfather Emperor Gaozong); his great-grandfather Lu Weishu (路惟恕) served as a prefectural prefect; and his grandfather Lu Junzhi (路俊之) served on the staff of a crown prince.

Lu Sui's father Lu Mi (路泌) was known for being learned and studious. When, during the revolt of the general Zhu Ci against Emperor Daizong's son Emperor Dezong, Emperor Dezong was forced to flee the capital Chang'an, first to Fengtian (奉天, in modern Xianyang, Shaanxi) and then to Xingyuan (興元, in modern Hanzhong), Lu Mi followed the emperor in his flight, leaving his wife and children at Chang'an. During flight, he was also injured when stricken by an arrow. He eventually came to serve under the important imperial general Hun Jian and was much respected by Hun, and he participated in Hun's campaign against another rebel general, Li Huaiguang, as Hun's secretary. He was with Hun in 787 when Hun met with the Tufan prime minister Shang Jiezan (尚結贊) to sign a peace treaty — when Shang laid a trap for Hun, intending to capture Hun; Hun escape, but many of his staff members were captured or killed. Lu Mi was captured and taken to the Tufan capital Lhasa. It was said that in his years at Lhasa, Lu Mi became well-learned in Buddhism, and was much respected by Tufan's king, but was never allowed to return to Tang until his death.

When Lu Mi was captured, Lu Sui was just a child, and it was said that after he grew up and found out that his father had been captured by Tufan, he would often weep day and night, and whenever he sat, he would face the west (toward Tufan); he also did not eat meat to mourn his father's capture. Because his mother told him that his appearance resembled his father's, he would refuse to look at mirrors. In 803, when Tufan sent letters offering peace, Lu Sui made three petitions to Emperor Dezong, begging for peace — such that Emperor Dezong sent an imperial eunuch to explain to him that Emperor Dezong distrusted Tufan offers of peace and was waiting for further proof of Tufan's good faith. Such proof never came for several years, however, and no further peace talks were held at that point.

== Early career ==
Eventually, Lu Sui passed the imperial examinations in the Mingjing (明經) class, and he was made a military advisor at Run Prefecture (潤州, in modern Zhenjiang, Jiangsu), which was then controlled by the warlord Li Qi, the military governor of Zhenhai Circuit (鎮海, headquartered at Run Prefecture). Li Qi wanted to humiliate Lu, so he made Lu be in charge of the market, but Lu, unembarrassed, sat in the market while overseeing it. When Wei Xiaqing (韋夏卿) the defender of the eastern capital Luoyang heard about this, he was impressed with Lu and invited Lu to serve on his staff, which furthered Lu's reputation.

== During Emperor Xianzong's reign ==
Meanwhile, by this point, Emperor Dezong's grandson Emperor Xianzong was emperor, and Tufan made periodic overtures of peace. Lu submitted five petitions to Emperor Xianzong arguing for peace and further also petitioned the chancellors; thereafter, the chancellors Pei Ji and Li Fan both spoke on his behalf as well. After peace was finally reached with Tufan, in 810, at the request of Emperor Xianzong, Tufan returned the caskets of Lu Mi and his colleague Zheng Shuju (鄭叔矩), as well as their tombstones and writings. Emperor Xianzong bestowed posthumous honors on Lu Mi and had him buried at state expense. Lu Sui observed a mourning period for his father, and after the mourning period was over, was made Zuo Bujue (左補闕), a low-level advisory official at the examination bureau of government (門下省, Menxia Sheng). Once, when the chancellor Li Jiang suggested that Emperor Xianzong listen more to advisory officials, Emperor Xianzong cited Lu and Wei Chuhou as two examples of advisory officials that he listened to. He was also made an editor of imperial history. He was subsequently made an imperial chronicler (起居郎, Qijulang), and then Sixun Yuanwailang (司勳員外郎), a low-level official at the ministry of civil service affairs (吏部, Libu), and continued to serve as an imperial history editor.

== During Emperor Muzong's reign ==
In 820, Emperor Xianzong died and was succeeded by his son Emperor Muzong. After Emperor Muzong's ascension, Lu Sui was promoted to be Sixun Langzhong (司勳郎中), a supervisory official at the ministry of civil service affairs, and both he and Wei Chuhou also became assistant imperial scholars at Hanlin Institute (翰林院). He was later made Jianyi Daifu (諫議大夫), a mid-level advisory official and continued to serve as assistant imperial scholar. As Emperor Muzong was commissioning the editing of the chronicles of Emperor Xianzong's reign, he again made Lu an editor as well.

== During Emperor Jingzong's reign ==
Emperor Muzong died in 824 and was succeeded by his son Emperor Jingzong. Lu Sui was thereafter promoted to be Zhongshu Sheren (中書舍人), a mid-level official at the legislative bureau (中書省, Zhongshu Sheng) and full imperial scholar (翰林學士, Hanlin Xueshi). When people sent congratulatory gifts of gold and silk, he responded, "How should I receive private wealth for a public matter?" and returned the gifts.

Around new year 827, Emperor Jingzong was assassinated by eunuchs and imperial guard officers who were resentful of his temper. The leading eunuch involved in the conspiracy, Liu Keming (劉克明), thereafter had Lu draft a will on Emperor Jingzong's behalf entrusting the matters of state to Emperor Muzong's younger brother Li Wu the Prince of Jiàng, but soon, a group of powerful eunuchs, including the directors of palace communications Wang Shoucheng and Yang Chenghe (楊承和) and the commanders of the Shence Armies (神策軍) Wei Congjian (魏從簡) and Liang Shouqian (梁守謙) counteracted against the conspirators and slaughtered them. In the aftermaths, Wang, after consulting with Wei Chuhou, had an edict issued in the name of Emperor Muzong's mother Grand Empress Dowager Guo naming Emperor Jingzong's younger brother Li Han (whose name was then changed to Li Ang) the Prince of Jiāng (note different tone than Li Wu) emperor (as Emperor Wenzong).

== During Emperor Wenzong's reign ==
Lu Sui appeared to not be considered a conspirator in the assassination of Emperor Jingzong, for he suffered no reprisals in the aftermaths — and as Wei Chuhou, who was then chief imperial scholar, was named chancellor soon after Emperor Wenzong's ascension, Lu was named chief imperial scholar to succeed him. He was thereafter made the deputy minister of defense (兵部侍郎, Bingbu Shilang) but was also responsible for drafting edicts. After Wei died in 828, he was made the deputy head of the legislative bureau (中書侍郎, Zhongshu Shilang) and chancellor de facto with the designation of Tong Zhongshu Menxia Pingzhangshi (同中書門下平章事). He also became responsible for overseeing the editing of the imperial history.

While Lu was serving as the lead editor of the imperial history, he became involved in a controversy over the editing. Previously, when Han Yu had been responsible for editing the chronicles of the reign of Emperor Xianzong's father Emperor Shunzong, Han wrote about much of what was going on in the palace, and that led to resentment by eunuchs, who often told the emperors that the chronicles were untrue. After Lu submitted the chronicles of Emperor Xianzong's reign to Emperor Wenzong, Emperor Wenzong ordered him to modify the chronicles of Emperor Shunzong's reign, which led Lu to submit a softly-worded apology about the inaccuracies and yet defended the integrity of the officials involved, as well as their independence as historians. As a result, Emperor Wenzong issued a modified order that suggested that, to the extent that there were references to events in the palace during Emperor Dezong's and Emperor Shunzong's reigns that could not be corroborated that those references should be removed, but that the chronicles should otherwise remain untouched.

In 829, at Lu's suggestion that it was inappropriate for chancellors to also oversee the finances of the state — citing past corrupt chancellors Yang Guozhong, Yuan Zai, and Huangfu Bo as examples — Lu's senior colleague Pei Du resigned his financial responsibilities to serve just as chancellor. In 830, Lu was made Menxia Shilang (門下侍郎), the deputy head of the examination bureau, and was given the additional title of senior scholar at Chongwen Pavilion (崇文館). In 833, he was also made a senior advisor to Emperor Wenzong's son and crown prince Li Yong; it was also that year that submitted chronicles of Emperor Xianzong's and Muzong's reigns to Emperor Wenzong. In 834, he offered to resign due to illness, but the resignation was not accepted. In 834, when Emperor Wenzong's close associate Zheng Zhu accused the former chancellor Li Deyu of conspiring with Du Zhongyang (杜仲陽) the wet nurse of Emperor Wenzong's brother Li Cou the Prince of Zhang, Lu not only did not cosign the accusation but further tried to defend Li Deyu, thus drawing Zheng's ire. Later that year, he was therefore sent out of Chang'an to serve as the military governor of Zhenhai Circuit and the prefect of Run Prefecture, without an opportunity to even meet the emperor to bid farewell, although he retained the Tong Zhongshu Menxia Pingzhangshi title as an honorary title. He died on the way to Zhenhai, while riding on a ship on the Yangtze River, and was given posthumous honors and the posthumous name Zhen (貞, "untainted").

== Notes and references ==
- Old Book of Tang, vol. 159.
- New Book of Tang, vol. 142.
- Zizhi Tongjian, vols. 237, 243, 244, 245.
