= Empress Dowager Guo (Tang dynasty) =

Empress dowager of Tang and wife of emperor Xianzong

Grand Empress Dowager of the Tang Dynasty
- Reign: 25 February 824 - 25 June 848
- Predecessor: None
- Successor: Grand Empress Dowager Zheng

Empress Dowager of the Tang Dynasty
- Reign: 20 February 820 - 24 February 824
- Predecessor: Empress Dowager Wang
- Successor: Empress Dowager Yi'an

Princess Consort of Guangling
- Reign: 793 - 28 August 805
- Born: unknown
- Died: 848 / 851
- Spouse: Emperor Xianzong
- Issue: Emperor Muzong; Li Wu; Princess Taihe
Posthumous name
- Empress Yian 懿安皇后
- Father: Guo Ai (郭曖)
- Mother: Princess Zhaoyi of Qi (齊國昭懿公主; eldest daughter of Emperor Daizong)

Empress Dowager Guo (郭太后, personal name unknown) (died June 25, 848), formally Empress Yi'an (懿安皇后, "the benevolent and peaceful empress"), was an empress dowager of the Chinese Tang dynasty. During the reign of her husband Emperor Xianzong, she was commonly regarded as his wife and the proper empress even though she never received the title from him, and she subsequently served as empress dowager during the reign of their son Emperor Muzong, their grandsons Emperor Jingzong, Emperor Wenzong, Emperor Wuzong, and his son (by a concubine) Emperor Xuānzong.

== Background ==
It is not known exactly when the future Empress Dowager Guo was born. Her father was the official Guo Ai (郭曖), one of the sons of the great general Guo Ziyi, and her mother was Princess Shengping, a daughter of Emperor Daizong. In 793—by which time her father Guo Ai was described to be deceased—she married Li Chun the Prince of Guangling, the oldest son of Li Song the Crown Prince, son of then-reigning Emperor Dezong (Emperor Daizong's son). (She was therefore marrying her cousin's son.) She thus became the Princess of Guangling. It was said that because her mother was a princess and her grandfather and father both had great contributions to the state, she was much favored by her father-in-law Li Song. In 795, she gave birth to Li Chun's third son Li You. Later she gave birth to Li Chun's sixth son Li Wu and a daughter Princess Qiyang.

== As imperial consort ==
In 805, Emperor Dezong died, and Li Song became emperor (as Emperor Shunzong), but as Emperor Shunzong was seriously ill himself, he yielded the throne to Li Chun later that year, and Li Chun took the throne (as Emperor Xianzong). Shortly after Emperor Xianzong took the throne, Princess Guo's mother Princess Shengping offered a tribute of 50 women to Emperor Xianzong, but Emperor Xianzong declined on the rationale that if Emperor Shunzong was not accepting tributes, neither could he. In 806, Emperor Xianzong created Princess Guo Guifei (貴妃) — the highest rank for imperial consorts — but did not create her empress, Because the position of empress was empty, even the central palace (residence of empresses) was given to her for living, and he left the administration of the palaces to her, and in all the special ceremonies of the imperial palace, court or family, she was allowed to sit in the same seat that only the empress could sit next to the emperor, the salary and daily necessities of her life in the palace were equal to the magnificent luxuries of an empress. He also did not create Li You crown prince; rather, he only created Li You the Prince of Sui, instead creating Li You's older brother Li Ning, the son of his concubine Consort Ji, crown prince. Only after Li Ning died in 811 was Li You (who was renamed Li Heng) created crown prince, bypassing another older brother, Li Kuan (李寬) the Prince of Li. Before doing so, Emperor Xianzong had the imperial scholar Cui Qun draft a petition offering to yield on Li Kuan's behalf, but Cui pointed out that Li Heng was born of a wife — and in doing so, recognized Consort Guo as Emperor Xianzong's wife rather than concubine — whereas Li Kuan was born of a concubine, and argued that such a petition would be unnecessary. Emperor Xianzong agreed and did not insist on such a petition.

It was said that the officials, throughout the years, submitted repeated petitions that Consort Guo be created empress, and the efforts became particularly intense in 813. However, Emperor Xianzong, who had many favorite concubines, was concerned that due to Consort Guo's honored lineage, if he created her empress, the other concubines would not be able to have sexual relations with him. He therefore declined on the basis that the times were not fortunate times.

In 820, Emperor Xianzong died suddenly — a death that was commonly believed to have been a murder carried out by the eunuch Chen Hongzhi (陳弘志). After some confusion, in which the powerful eunuch Tutu Chengcui apparently tried to have Li Kuan (whose name had been changed to Li Yun (李惲) by this point) made emperor, several other key eunuchs — Liang Shouqian (梁守謙), Ma Jintan (馬進潭), Liu Chengjie (劉承偕), Wei Yuansu (韋元素), and Wang Shoucheng — had Tutu and Li Yun killed, and they supported Li Heng to be emperor (as Emperor Muzong). Emperor Muzong honored Consort Guo as empress dowager. (Another son of Emperor Xianzong's, Li Yi, would later suspect Consort Guo and Li Heng of being complicit in Emperor Xianzong's murder, although there was no particular evidence linking either to the murder.)

== As empress dowager and grand empress dowager ==
=== During Emperor Muzong's reign ===
After Emperor Muzong took the throne, he took much effort to posthumously honor Empress Dowager Guo's male ancestors and her mother, as well as give her older brothers Guo Zhao (郭釗) and Guo Cong (郭鏦) high honors. She took up residence at Xingqing Palace (興慶宮), and he visited her twice a month. Whenever it was her birthday or a particularly special day, he would greet her along with officials in grand ceremonies, and he was exuberant in providing supplies to her palace, to the point of being excessive and wasteful.

In 821, a daughter of Empress Dowager Guo's, Princess Taihe, was sent to the Uyghur Empire to marry the Chongde Khan.

On an occasion in 822, when Empress Dowager Guo visited Huaqing Palace (華清宮, known for its hot springs), Emperor Muzong joined her there, although he returned to the capital Chang'an after just one day and she spent several days there before returning to Chang'an.

In 824, Emperor Muzong became seriously ill, and by his orders, his son and crown prince Li Zhan was made regent. The eunuchs suggested that Empress Dowager Guo should herself assume the regency — to which she responded:

When Empress Wu assumed the regency, the dynasty was almost destroyed. My clan has been loyal and righteous for generations, unlike the Wu clan. Although the Crown Prince is young, so as long as able chancellors can assist him, and people like you do not interfere, in what way will the state be unsafe? Ever since ancient times, it cannot be the case that a woman governs the state and leads it to a reign like those of Yao and Shun.

Empress Dowager Guo took the proposed edict in which she is named regent and tore it up herself. Her brother Guo Zhao also opposed the proposal, and the proposal was not carried out. That evening, Emperor Muzong died, and Li Zhan took the throne (as Emperor Jingzong).

=== During Emperor Jingzong's reign ===
Emperor Jingzong honored Empress Dowager Guo as grand empress dowager, while honoring his mother Consort Wang as empress dowager. Later that year, when a disturbance led by two commoners, Su Xuanming (蘇玄明) and Zhang Shao (張韶), caused him to flee the palace briefly and flee to the Shence Army (神策軍) camps, he was concerned about the safety of the two empresses dowager and had the soldiers escort them to the Shence Army camps as well. Only after the disturbance was suppressed did he (and presumably they) return to the palace.

In 826, Emperor Jingzong was assassinated by a group of eunuchs led by Su Zuoming (蘇佐明). Another eunuch, Liu Keming (劉克明), wanted to support Emperor Jingzong's brother Li Wu the Prince of Jiàng as emperor, but Wang Shoucheng, Yang Chenghe (楊承和), Wei Congjian (魏從簡), and Liang Shouqian instead supported another brother of Emperor Jingzong's, Li Han the Prince of Jiāng (note different tone). Their troops battled Liu's and prevailed, killing Liu and Li Wu. An edict was issued in Grand Empress Dowager Guo's name, naming Li Han emperor (as Emperor Wenzong).

=== During Emperor Wenzong's reign ===
Emperor Wenzong honored his mother Consort Xiao as an empress dowager as well — so there were three empresses dowager. It was said that he was filially pious toward all three, and that whenever he received precious things, he would first offer them to the three empresses dowager.

In 838, there was an incident that shortly after two daughters of Grand Empress Dowager Guo's uncle Guo Min (郭旼) arrived at the palace to visit her, Guo Min was made the military governor (Jiedushi) of Binning Circuit (邠寧, headquartered in modern Xianyang, Shaanxi). The imperial scholar Liu Gongquan pointed out to Emperor Wenzong that the people came to believe that Guo Min had offered his two daughters to be Emperor Wenzong's concubines, and in exchange was made a military governor. At Liu's suggestion, that same day, Grand Empress Dowager Guo had her two cousins leave the palace and return to Guo Min's house.

=== During Emperor Wuzong's reign ===
In 840, Emperor Wenzong died, and his younger brother Li Chan became emperor (as Emperor Wuzong). It was said that Emperor Wuzong favored hunting and martial games, and that the imperial servants known as the Wufang Boys (五坊小兒) were allowed to enter and leave the palace at will due to his favors for them. In 841, on an occasion when he went to greet Grand Empress Dowager Guo and asked her for advice on governing the state, she suggested that he listen to the advice of the officials. Once he left her presence, he reviewed the petitions from the officials, and many of them advised him against hunting and games. Thereafter, he reduced those activities and the awards that he was giving the Wufang Boys.

=== During Emperor Xuānzong's reign ===
In 846, Emperor Wuzong died, and his uncle Li Yi (whose name was then changed to Li Chen)—Emperor Xianzong's son by his concubine Consort Zheng—became emperor (as Emperor Xuānzong). Grand Empress Dowager Guo continued to be grand empress dowager, but Emperor Xuānzong's mother Consort Zheng was honored as empress dowager. Emperor Xuānzong's brother, the late Emperor Muzong, was the son of then crown prince Li Chun's Main Consort (Lady Guo); thus in the hereditary monarchy, he inherited the most legitimate right to the Tang dynasty throne. Although Emperor Muzong's three sons (Emperor Jingzong, Emperor Wenzong and Emperor Wuzong) had all produced male heirs, Xuānzong still ascended to the throne with the support of the powerful group of eunuchs. As a consequence, all Grand Empress Dowager Guo's descendants lost the right to claim the Tang's crown. To add insult to injury, Consort Zheng, who had previously been a servant girl of Grand Empress Dowager Guo's before she became an imperial consort, resented Grand Empress Dowager Guo, Emperor Xuānzong did not treat Grand Empress Dowager Guo with great respect. On June 25 848, Grand Empress Dowager Guo attempted to commit suicide when visiting Qinzheng Tower (勤政樓), by throwing herself off the high tower; only to be stopped by her attendants. Emperor Xuānzong was furious when he learned about the incident. Grand Empress Dowager Guo died that very night; no cause of death was recorded. As Emperor Xuānzong wanted to reserve for his mother Empress Dowager Zheng the honor of being buried with Emperor Xianzong, he did not want Grand Empress Dowager Guo to be buried with Emperor Xianzong. The officials thus suggested that she be buried in the outer perimeters of his tomb Jingling (景陵) and that her spirit tablet not be placed inside his temple. When the official Wang Hao (王皞) earnestly opposed the proposal and suggested that she be buried with Emperor Xianzong and be worshipped in his temple, Wang offended both Emperor Xuānzong and the chancellor Bai Minzhong, and was exiled. Still, in the aftermaths of the dispute, she was buried with Emperor Xianzong, although she was still not worshipped at his temple. Only during the reign of Emperor Xuānzong's son Emperor Yizong, when Wang had been recalled and again advocated for her enshrinement, was she enshrined at Emperor Xianzong's temple.

== Styles ==
- Lady Guo (郭氏; until 793)
- During the reigns of Emperor Dezong (r.779-805) and Emperor Shunzong (r.805-806)
  - Princess Consort of Guangling (廣陵王妃/广陵王妃; from 793)
- During the reign of Emperor Xianzong (r.806-820)
  - Noble Consort (貴妃/贵妃; from 806), first rank consort
- During the reign of Emperor Muzong (r.820-824)
  - Empress Dowager (皇太后; from 820)
- During the reigns of Emperor Jingzong (r.824-827), Emperor Wenzong (r.827-840), Emperor Wuzong (r.840-846) and Emperor Xuānzong (r.846-859)
  - Grand Empress Dowager (太皇太后; from 824)
  - Empress Yi'an (懿安皇后; from 848)

== Depictions in popular culture ==
- Portrayed by Susan Tse in Beyond the Realm of Conscience (2009)

== Notes and references ==
- Old Book of Tang, vol. 52.
- New Book of Tang, vol. 77.
- Zizhi Tongjian, vols. 234, 236, 237, 238, 241, 242, 243, 246, 248, 250.
