= Li Wu =

Li Wu (李悟) (died January 10, 827), né Li Liao (李寮), formally the Prince of Jiàng (絳王), was an imperial prince of the Chinese Tang dynasty who, after the assassination of his nephew Emperor Jingzong, was poised to take the throne, but was then himself killed in the armed conflict between the eunuchs who supported him and those who supported Emperor Jingzong's younger brother Li Han, who took the throne as Emperor Wenzong.

== Background ==
Li Wu was the sixth son of Emperor Xianzong. It is not known when he was born; his mother was Consort Guo, the later Grand Empress Dowager Guo. He must have been born, however, in or before 805, as in 805, the same year when Emperor Xianzong's grandfather Emperor Dezong died and was succeeded by Emperor Xianzong's father Emperor Shunzong, he was created the Prince of Wen'an. He was originally named Li Liao, but his name was changed to Li Wu when Emperor Xianzong changed the names of many of his sons in 812.

== Death ==
On January 9, 827, Li Wu's nephew Emperor Jingzong, the son of Li Wu's older brother Emperor Muzong, was assassinated by a group of imperial guard officers and eunuchs, led by the officer Su Zuoming (蘇佐明) and the eunuch Liu Keming (劉克明), who were fearful of his violent temper. Liu ordered the imperial scholar Lu Sui to draft a will for Emperor Jingzong putting Li Wu in charge of the affairs of state. The next day, this will was publicly read, and Li Wu met with the imperial officials in person.

Liu, meanwhile, planned to replace the powerful eunuchs — including the directors of palace communications (Shumishi) Wang Shoucheng and Yang Chenghe (楊承和) and the commandants (中尉, Zhongwei) of the Shence Armies Wei Congjian (魏從簡) and Liang Shouqian (梁守謙). They reacted by launching the Shence Armies, as well as the Flying Dragon Soldiers (飛龍兵), to attack Liu and Su and their followers. Liu, Su, and their party was slaughtered, and the four powerful eunuchs supported Emperor Jingzong's younger brother Li Han the Prince of Jiāng to be emperor instead (as Emperor Wenzong). During the battle, Li Wu was also killed. Li Wu had at least two sons — Li Zhu (李洙) and Li Pang (李滂) — whom Emperor Wenzong later created imperial princes, and a daughter that Emperor Wenzong later created the Princess Shou'an and married to the Wang Yuankui, jiedushi of Chengde Circuit. Another daughter Princess Jianghua married Guo Congzhen, a cousin of Empress Dowager Guo.

== Family ==
Father:

- Emperor Xianzong of Tang

Mother:

- Consort Guo

Issue and Descendents:

- Li Zhu, Prince of Xin'an Commandery (新安郡王 李洙), first son.
- Li Pang, Prince of Gaoping Commandery (高平郡王 李滂), second son.
- Princess Shou'an (壽安公主), married to Wang Yuankui (王元逵), jiedushi of Chengde Circuit.
- Princess Jianghua (江華縣主; died December 16, 840), married to Guo Congzhen (郭从真).
