= Wang Shoucheng =

Wang Shoucheng (王守澄) (died 3 November 835) was a powerful eunuch of the Tang dynasty of China, wielding substantial powers during the reigns of Emperor Xianzong, Emperor Muzong, Emperor Jingzong, and Emperor Wenzong. By 835, however, two non-eunuchs that he had recommended to Emperor Wenzong — Li Xun and Zheng Zhu — were plotting with Emperor Wenzong to exterminate the eunuchs, and as part of the plan, Emperor Wenzong sent poison to Wang and ordered him to commit suicide.

== During Emperor Xianzong's reign ==
Both Wang Shoucheng's birthdate and geographic origins have been lost to history. The earliest historical records of his activities indicated that during the reign of Emperor Xianzong, when the general Li Su served as the military governor (Jiedushi) of Wuning Circuit (武寧, headquartered in modern Xuzhou, Jiangsu), Wang served as the eunuch monitor of the Wuning army. While both Wang and Li were at Wuning, one of Li's subordinates introduced Li to the physician Zheng Zhu, as Li was frequently ill. Li was helped by Zheng's medicines, and subsequently, Zheng took substantial power at the Wuning headquarters. At the other officers' requests, Wang requested that Li remove Zheng. Li admitted that Zheng was frivolous, but indicated that Zheng was witty and engaging in talk. At Li's insistence, Wang met Zheng, and soon was also impressed by Zheng's wit; he was also helped by Zheng's medicines as well. Zheng thereafter became a close associate of Wang's.

By 820, Wang was back in the capital Chang'an and serving in the palace. That spring, Emperor Xianzong died suddenly — traditionally believed to be in an assassination by the eunuch Chen Hongzhi (陳弘志), although Wang's biography in the New Book of Tang indicated that Wang was also involved in the assassination. In the aftermaths of Emperor Xianzong's death, the powerful eunuch Tutu Chengcui tried to support Emperor Xianzong's oldest surviving son Li Yun (李惲) the Prince of Li as emperor, but other eunuchs, including Wang, Liang Shouqian (梁守謙), Ma Jintan (馬進潭), Liu Chengjie (劉承偕), and Wei Yuansu (韋元素) supported another son of Emperor Xianzong's, the Crown Prince Li Heng, and they killed Tutu and Li Yun. Li Heng subsequently took the throne (as Emperor Muzong).

== During Emperor Muzong's reign ==
During Emperor Muzong's reign, Wang Shoucheng became one of the two palace secretaries general (Shumishi). He was said to be very powerful and involved in affairs of state, such that in 823, the official Zheng Quan (鄭權) was able to beg Wang through Zheng Zhu and be made the military governor of Lingnan Circuit (嶺南, headquartered in modern Guangzhou, Guangdong). Wang was also in an alliance with the chancellor Li Fengji.

== During Emperor Jingzong's reign ==
In 824, Emperor Muzong died and was succeeded by his son Emperor Jingzong. Li Fengji subsequently had Wang Shoucheng report to Emperor Jingzong that their political enemy, the imperial scholar Li Shen (李紳), had wanted to support Emperor Muzong's younger brother Li Cong (李悰) the Prince of Shen instead of Emperor Jingzong. As a result, Li Shen was exiled.

During Emperor Jingzong's reign, Wang remained highly influential in policy decisions. For example, in 825, it was said that it was at the decision of Li Fengji and Wang that, after the death of Liu Wu the military governor of Zhaoyi Circuit (昭義, headquartered in modern Changzhi, Shanxi) that Liu Wu's son Liu Congjian was allowed to inherit Zhaoyi Circuit.

In 826, Emperor Jingzong was assassinated by his polo player Su Zuoming (蘇佐明). The eunuch Liu Keming (劉克明) supported Emperor Muzong's younger brother Li Wu the Prince of Jiàng, and at one point, Li Wu was meeting with the officials and acting as if he would be the next emperor. However, Wang and other powerful eunuchs, including Yang Chenghe (楊承和), Wei Congjian (魏從簡), and Liang Shouqian, soon mobilized their troops and attacked Liu's party. Liu committed suicide, while Li Wu was killed. They supported Emperor Jingzong's younger brother Li Han the Prince of Jiāng (note different tone), who changed his name to Li Ang, as emperor (as Emperor Wenzong). It was Wang who consulted with the imperial scholar Wei Chuhou to deal with the ceremony of Emperor Wenzong's enthronement after the coup.

== During Emperor Wenzong's reign ==
After Emperor Wenzong's enthronement, Wang Shoucheng was given the honorific title of Piaoqi Dajiangjun (驃騎大將軍) and made the commander of the Right Shence Army (右神策軍). As time went by, Emperor Wenzong came to be apprehensive that those he believed to be involved in Emperors Xianzong's and Jingzong's death were still in the palace, and, in particular, he became displeased at Wang's hold on politics and open receptions of bribery. He began to discuss a way to counteract Wang with the imperial scholar Song Shenxi, and in 830 made Song chancellor. After Song involved Wang Fan (王繙) the mayor of Jingzhao Municipality (京兆, i.e., the Chang'an region) in 831, however, Wang Fan leaked the plan, and Wang Shoucheng and Zheng Zhu came to know about the plan. Zheng reacted by ordering the Shence Army officer Doulu Zhu (豆盧著) to falsely accuse Song of plotting treason to put Emperor Wenzong's younger brother Li Cou the Prince of Zhang on the throne. When Wang Shoucheng relayed the accusation to Emperor Wenzong, Emperor Wenzong believed it and was angry. Wang Shoucheng initially wanted to take this opportunity to massacre Song's household, but was stopped by another powerful eunuch, Ma Cunliang (馬存亮). However, during the subsequent investigations by Shence Army officers, after an attendant official to the imperial princes, Yan Jingze (晏敬則), and Song's associate Wang Shiwen (王師文) were tortured and confessed to serving as conduits for messages between Song and Li Cou, Song was found to be guilty and was set to be executed. The advisorial officials Cui Xuanliang (崔玄亮), Li Guyan, Wang Zhi (王質), Lu Jun (盧均), Shu Yuanbao (舒元褒), Jiang Xi (蔣係), Pei Xiu (裴休), and Wei Wen (韋溫) urged caution, however, believed there were substantial questions in the matter and urged a reinvestigation by imperial government officials. The chancellor Niu Sengru also took the same view. Zheng, fearing that a reinvestigation would lead to discovery of the truth, suggested to Wang Shoucheng that he recommend to Emperor Wenzong that neither Song nor Li Cou be executed. Li Cou was thus demoted to the title of Duke of Chao County (巢縣, in modern Chaohu, Anhui) while Song was demoted to be the military advisor to the prefect of Kai Prefecture (開州, in modern Chongqing).

Emperor Wenzong was, by this point, finding Wang Shoucheng's and Zheng's relationship to be distasteful, but after Emperor Wenzong suffered a stroke in 833, Wang recommended Zheng for his medical abilities, and after Emperor Wenzong was helped by Zheng's medicines, he began to favor Zheng as well. Around the same time, Zheng also introduced Li Zhongyan to Wang and Emperor Wenzong. Both became close associates of Emperor Wenzong's, and Li Zhongyan was made an imperial scholar over the objection of the chancellor Li Deyu, who was subsequently demoted out of the capital.

In 835, Emperor Wenzong was again discussing the matter of killing powerful eunuchs, this time with Zheng and Li Zhongyan — as he believed that, since Zheng and Li Zhongyan were recommended by Wang, they would not draw the suspicions from the eunuchs. At their suggestion, Emperor Wenzong first diverted some of Wang's authority by giving the command of the Left Shence Army (左神策軍) to Wang's rival among the eunuchs, Qiu Shiliang, displacing Wang's ally Wei Yuansu, in 835. Subsequently, Zheng and Li Zhongyan (whose name had been changed to Li Xun by this point) had Wei, Yang Chenghe, and another eunuch, Wang Jianyan (王踐言), sent out of Chang'an to serve as army monitors, and also had two other chancellors, Lu Sui and Li Zongmin, demoted. Later that year, Wang Shoucheng was given the high title of the supreme monitor of the Left and Right Shence Armies and supreme commander of the 12 imperial guard corps — in order for Emperor Wenzong to strip him of the command of the Right Shence Army. Soon thereafter, at Zheng's and Li Xun's suggestion, Emperor Wenzong sent the eunuch Li Haogu (李好古) to Wang's mansion with poison, ordering Wang to commit suicide. However, publicly, Emperor Wenzong did not allow the details be known, and posthumously honored Wang. Zheng and Li Xun thereafter planned to use Wang's funeral as the occasion to trap the eunuchs and massacre them, but Li Xun, wanting all the credit by himself, preempted the plan, but failed, in what later became known as the Ganlu Incident, leading to the eunuchs' massacre of four chancellors (in addition to Li Xun, who was chancellor by this point, Wang Ya, Jia Su, and Shu Yuanyu) and governmental officials.

== Notes and references ==
- Old Book of Tang, vol. 184.
- New Book of Tang, vol. 208.
- Zizhi Tongjian, vols. 241, 243, 244, 245.
