= 835 =

Calendar year

835 in various calendars
- Gregorian calendar: 835; DCCCXXXV
- Ab urbe condita: 1588
- Armenian calendar: 284; ԹՎ ՄՁԴ
- Assyrian calendar: 5585
- Balinese saka calendar: 756–757
- Bengali calendar: 241–242
- Berber calendar: 1785
- Buddhist calendar: 1379
- Burmese calendar: 197
- Byzantine calendar: 6343–6344
- Chinese calendar: 甲寅年 (Wood Tiger); 3532 or 3325 — to — 乙卯年 (Wood Rabbit); 3533 or 3326
- Coptic calendar: 551–552
- Discordian calendar: 2001
- Ethiopian calendar: 827–828
- Hebrew calendar: 4595–4596
- Hindu calendars
- Vikram Samvat: 891–892
- Shaka Samvat: 756–757
- Kali Yuga: 3935–3936
- Holocene calendar: 10835
- Iranian calendar: 213–214
- Islamic calendar: 219–221
- Japanese calendar: Jōwa 2 (承和２年)
- Javanese calendar: 731–732
- Julian calendar: 835; DCCCXXXV
- Korean calendar: 3168
- Minguo calendar: 1077 before ROC 民前1077年
- Nanakshahi calendar: −633
- Seleucid era: 1146/1147 AG
- Thai solar calendar: 1377–1378
- Tibetan calendar: ཤིང་ཕོ་སྟག་ལོ་ (male Wood-Tiger); 961 or 580 or −192 — to — ཤིང་མོ་ཡོས་ལོ་ (female Wood-Hare); 962 or 581 or −191

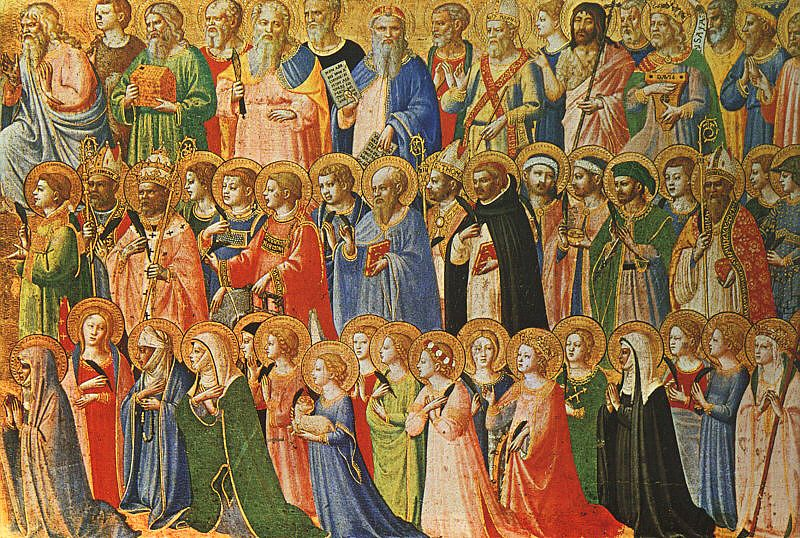
Pope Gregory IV celebrates All Saints

Year 835 (DCCCXXXV) was a common year starting on Friday of the Julian Calendar.

== Events ==
=== By place ===
==== Europe ====
- Ragnar Lodbrok, a Norse Viking ruler, rises to power. He becomes the scourge of France and England (approximate date).

==== British Isles ====
- Danish Viking raiders ally with the Cornish, against the rule of Ecgberht, King of Wessex (approximate date).
- The Isle of Sheppey (off the northern coast of Kent) is attacked by Vikings.
- Vikings raid the Kingdom of Munster in Ireland, at Inis Cathaigh.

==== China ====
- December 14 – Sweet Dew Incident: Emperor Wenzong of Tang plots to free the court from the influence of his palace eunuchs. In the northeast sector of the capital, Chang'an, after the failure of the emperor's chancellor Li Zhongyan to subdue the eunuchs' influence, troops under the eunuchs' command slaughter many officials and other associates.

=== By topic ===
==== Religion ====
- November 1 – Pope Gregory IV promotes the celebration of the feast of All Saints on this day throughout the Frankish Empire.

== Births ==
- c. September 20 – Ahmad ibn Tulun, Muslim governor (d. 884)
- Ahmad ibn Yusuf, Muslim mathematician (d. 912)
- Guaifer of Salerno, Lombard prince (approximate date)
- Louis the Younger, king of East Francia (or 830)
- Qian Kuan, Chinese warlord (approximate date)

== Deaths ==
- February 10 – Li Cou, Chinese prince of the Tang dynasty
- February 27 – Li Fengji, Chinese chancellor of the Tang dynasty (b. 758)
- April 1 – Duan Wenchang, Chinese chancellor of the Tang dynasty (b. 773)
- April 22 – Kūkai, Japanese Buddhist monk (b. 774)
- c. June – Berengar the Wise, Frankish nobleman
- August 16 – Lu Sui, Chinese chancellor of the Tang dynasty (b. 776)
- November 3 – Wang Shoucheng, Chinese eunuch and official
- c. November 29 – Muhammad al-Jawad, 9th Twelver Shī'ah Imām (b. 811)
- December 7 – Jia Su, Chinese chancellor of the Tang dynasty, killed
- December 16 – Li Zhongyan, Chinese chancellor of the Tang dynasty, killed
- December 17 – killed:
  - Shu Yuanyu, Chinese official and chancellor
  - Wang Ya, Chinese chancellor of the Tang dynasty
- December 18 – Zheng Zhu, Chinese general and official, killed
- Lu Tong, Chinese poet (b. 790)
- Sabrisho II, patriarch of the Church of the East
- Song Ruoxian, Chinese scholar, lady-in-waiting and poet (b. 772)
- Vladislav, duke of Croatia (approximate date)
- Yang Zhicheng, exiled Chinese governor (jiedushi), executed
