= Zheng Tan =

Chinese historian and politician

Zheng Tan (鄭覃) (died 842), formally the Duke of Xingyang (滎陽公), was a Chinese historian and politician during the Tang dynasty, serving as a chancellor during the reign of Emperor Wenzong. He was viewed as a Li Faction leader in the Niu-Li Factional Struggles.

== Background ==
It is not known when Zheng Tan was born. He came from a prominent line, as his father Zheng Xunyu was a chancellor during the reigns of Emperor Dezong and Emperor Dezong's son Emperor Shunzong. As a result of his father's status, Zheng Tan was able to start his official career as a copyeditor (校書郎, Xiaoshu Lang) at Hongwen Institute (弘文館). He subsequently went through the ranks of low-level advisory officials as Shiyi (拾遺) and then Bujue (補闕); he then served successively as Kaogong Yuanwailang (考功員外郎), a low-level official at the ministry of civil service affairs (吏部, Libu), and then Xingbu Langzhong (刑部郎中), a supervisory official at the ministry of justice (刑部, Xingbu).

== During Emperor Xianzong's reign ==
In 819, during the reign of Emperor Shunzong's son Emperor Xianzong, Zheng Tan was made Jianyi Daifu (諫議大夫), a fairly high-level advisory official. On an occasion when Emperor Xianzong wanted to make five eunuchs directors of troop food supplies for Tang's northwestern border with the Uyghur and Tibetan Empires, Zheng submitted a petition against the action and the order was cancelled.

== During Emperor Muzong's reign ==
In 820, Emperor Xianzong died and was succeeded by his son Emperor Muzong. Emperor Muzong was considered pleasure-loving, and in winter 820, there was an occasion when Emperor Muzong met with the imperial officials in the palace. Zheng Tan, his colleague Cui Yan (崔郾), and three other advisory officials took the opportunity to advise him that he was spending too much time in feast and games, and was overly exhausting the imperial treasury with his rewards to his favorites. Emperor Muzong was much surprised and initially displeased by the advice, and asked the chancellor Xiao Mian who these officials were. Xiao informed him that these were advisory officials. Emperor Muzong thus understood that they were giving him advice, and he dismissed them with kind words, but did not actually carry out their advice.

Around that time, Wang Chengzong the military governor (jiedushi) of Chengde Circuit (成德, headquartered in modern Shijiazhuang, Hebei)—whose circuit had long been resistant to imperial rule—died. In light of Wang Chengzong's death, the Chengde soldiers wanted to support his brother Wang Chengyuan as the new military governor, but Wang Chengyuan wished to turn control of the circuit over to the imperial government. Nevertheless, the soldiers were not allowing him to depart and head for his new post as the military governor of Yicheng Circuit (義成, headquartered in modern Anyang, Henan). Wang Chengyuan requested Emperor Muzong to send a senior official to encourage the soldiers to obey the imperial order, so Emperor Muzong sent Zheng to Chengde, assisted by Wang Fan (王璠), to declare the imperial orders and to give a large cash award to the Chengde soldiers. It was said that when Zheng arrived at Chengde, he explained to the soldiers the importance of loyalty to the imperial government, and the soldiers thus allowed Wang Chengyuan to leave.

In 821, Zheng was involved in an incident that was considered one of the precipitating incidents of the coming Niu-Li Factional Struggles. At that time, both Yuan Zhen, an official at the legislative bureau of government (中書省, Zhongshu Sheng) and imperial scholar Li Deyu were involved in power struggles with another official, Li Zongmin. Meanwhile, Li Zongmin's junior colleague at the legislative bureau, Yang Rushi (楊汝士) and the deputy minister of rites (禮部侍郎, Libu Shilang) Qian Hui (錢徽) were in charge of overseeing the imperial examinations. The military governor Duan Wenchang (a former chancellor) and the imperial scholar Li Shen both made secret pleas to Qian for certain examinees. However, when the results were announced, the examinees that Duan and Li Shen recommended were not given passing results, while among those passing the examinations were Zheng Tan's brother Zheng Lang; Pei Zhuan (裴譔) the son of the military governor Pei Du (a former chancellor); Li Zongmin's son-in-law Su Chao (蘇巢); and Yang Rushi's brother Yang Yinshi (楊殷士). This thus brought a popular uproar, and Duan submitted a report accusing Yang Rushi and Qian of being unfair. When Emperor Muzong requested opinions from the imperial scholars, Li Deyu, Yuan, and Li Shen all agreed with Duan's opinion. Emperor Muzong thus ordered Li Zongmin's colleague Wang Qi (王起) to conduct a re-examination, while demoting Qian, Li Zongmin, and Yang Rushi to be prefectural prefects and deposing 10 of the examinees selected by Qian and Yang Rushi. This was said to be the start of some 40 years of struggles between Li Deyu and his associates (known as the Li Faction) and Li Zongmin and his associates (known as the Niu Faction, named after Li Zongmin's ally Niu Sengru). (Despite the way the incident occurred, Zheng himself was usually viewed as a leader of the Li faction as well.) Late in 821, Zheng Tan was made an imperial attendant (給事中, Jishizhong).

== During Emperor Jingzong's reign ==
In 824, the same year that Emperor Muzong died and was succeeded by his son Emperor Jingzong, Zheng Tan was made deputy chief imperial censor (御史中丞, Yushi Zhongcheng). Late in the year, he was also made acting deputy minister of public works (工部侍郎, Gongbu Shilang). In 825, he was made the mayor of Jingzhao Municipality (京兆, i.e., the region of the capital Chang'an).

== During Emperor Wenzong's reign ==
=== Before chancellorship ===
After Emperor Jingzong was assassinated around new year 827 and was succeeded by his brother Emperor Wenzong, Zheng Tan was made Zuo Sanqi Changshi (左散騎常侍), a senior advisory official at the examination bureau of government (門下省, Menxia Sheng). In 829, he was also given the title of assistant imperial scholar (翰林侍講學士). In 830, he was made deputy minister of public works. It was said that Zheng was learned in the Confucian classics and was upright in his behavior, and therefore Emperor Wenzong respected him. At Zheng's suggestion, Emperor Wenzong started a project where the text of the Confucian classics were edited, commentaries were written, and the resulting text carved onto stone tablets and displayed publicly at the imperial university. (This project would not be completed until 837, when Zheng would be chancellor.)

As of 831, Li Zongmin and Niu Sengru were chancellors, and Li Zongmin, because Zheng was friendly with Li Deyu, viewed Zheng pejoratively. He was, in particular, disliking the fact that Zheng, as assistant imperial scholar, would have access to the emperor. He thus recommended Zheng to be the minister of public works (工部尚書, Gongbu Shangshu) but had him stripped of his assistant imperial scholar status. However, Emperor Wenzong, who was interested in studying the Confucian classics, missed Zheng, and he again made Zheng assistant imperial scholar in 832. In 833, after Li Deyu became chancellor to replace Niu, there was a time when Emperor Wenzong complimented the knowledge that Yin You (殷侑) had about the classics, comparing him to Zheng. Li Zongmin responded, "Perhaps Zheng Tan and Yin You have understanding of the classics, but their suggestions are not worth listening to." Li Deyu responded, "The suggestions of Zheng Tan and Yin You are ignored by others, but not by Your Imperial Majesty." Soon thereafter, without further consulting Li Zongmin, Emperor Wenzong made Zheng the chief imperial censor (御史大夫, Yushi Daifu). Soon thereafter, Li Zongmin was sent out of the capital to serve as the military governor of Shannan West Circuit (山南西道, headquartered in modern Hanzhong, Shaanxi).

In 834, Zheng was made the minister of census (戶部尚書, Hubu Shangshu). Later in the year, Li Deyu was stripped of his chancellor post, and Li Zongmin, who again became chancellor, worked in conjunction with Emperor Wenzong's close associates Li Xun and Zheng Zhu to eject Li Deyu's allies out of important posts. Zheng Tan was thereafter made Mishu Jian (秘書監), the head of the Palace Library. In summer 835, after Li Zongmin and his ally Yang Yuqing (楊虞卿) offended Emperor Wenzong and were exiled, Zheng was made the minister of justice (刑部尚書, Xingbu Shangshu). In winter 835, he was made You Pushe (右僕射), one of the heads of the executive bureau (尚書省, Shangshu Sheng) as well as the principal of the imperial university (國子祭酒, Guozi Jijiu).

Soon thereafter, a plot by Emperor Wenzong, Li Xun, and Zheng Zhu to slaughter the powerful eunuchs (later known as the Ganlu Incident) ended in failure—with the eunuchs arresting or slaughtering Li Xun, Zheng Zhu, and many other imperial officials, including Li Xun's fellow chancellors Wang Ya, Jia Su, and Shu Yuanyu—at the eunuchs' prompting, Emperor Wenzong summoned Zheng Tan and his Pushe colleague Linghu Chu to the palace to examine a confession by Wang—extracted under torture—that he and the other officials were set to overthrow Emperor Wenzong and replace him with Zheng Zhu. Linghu and Zheng Tan confirmed that the handwriting was Wang's. Subsequently, Emperor Wenzong kept Zheng Tan and Linghu at the Office of the Chancellors to oversee the aftermaths. (Li Xun, Wang, Jia, and Shu were subsequently executed, while Zheng Zhu was killed in an ambush.) Linghu, however, subsequently offended the leading eunuch Qiu Shiliang by drafting an edict that, while condemning Wang and the other chancellors of treason, was in such empty language to imply the lack of believability of the treason allegations, and was not made chancellor. Zheng Tan was subsequently made chancellor de facto with the designation Tong Zhongshu Menxia Pingzhangshi (同中書門下平章事), along with Li Shi. Zheng was also created the Duke of Yingyang.

=== Chancellorship ===
At the time that Zheng Tan and Li Shi served as chancellors, the eunuchs, led by Qiu Shiliang, often tried to humiliate the imperial officials by citing the examples of Li Xun and Zheng Zhu. It was said that Li Shi and Zheng Tan responded by pointing out that Li Xun and Zheng Zhu had initially been recommended to Emperor Wenzong by the eunuch Wang Shoucheng. Thereafter, it was said that the eunuchs' arrogance subsided somewhat, and the imperial officials depended on Li Shi and Zheng Tan to protect them. Soon thereafter, there was an incident in which, when the eunuch Tian Quancao (田全操) returned to the capital, he had remarked that when he got to the capital he would slaughter the officials, causing a general panic in Chang'an. Zheng suggested to Li Shi that they find refuge when Tian was approaching Chang'an, but Li Shi refused, pointing out that if even the chancellors fled, the panic would overtake the capital entirely, and that if there were to be disaster, they would not be able to get away anyway. Zheng agreed. Subsequently, Zheng and Li Shi urged that the relatives of Li Xun and the other executed officials be no longer pursued.

However, the eunuchs continued to be in control of the government, and it was said that the imperial officials worried about being slaughtered on a daily basis. It was not until spring 836, when Liu Congjian the military governor of Zhaoyi Circuit (昭義, headquartered in modern Changzhi, Shanxi), submitted harshly worded petitions protesting the innocence of Wang Ya and Jia Su and accusing Qiu of crimes, did Qiu and the other eunuchs began to cut back on their behavior and allow Emperor Wenzong, as well as Li Shi and Zheng, to exercise their authority.

It was said that Zheng, while well-learned, was not a good writer, and he despised the Jinshi imperial examinees for their overly-grand writing. He therefore suggested that the Jinshi examinations be abolished—a suggestion that Emperor Wenzong did not accept. Still, when Emperor Wenzong and Zheng had a discussion about poetry, Zheng pointed out that the poetry of the time often had inflated language and often were completely not descriptive. Meanwhile, with the imperial university carrying out the classics-carving project, at Zheng's recommendation, the officials Zhou Chi, Cui Qiu (崔球), Zhang Cizong (張次宗), and Wen Ye (溫業) were put in charge of the project. When the project was completed, Zheng was given the additional offices of Menxia Shilang (門下侍郎, the deputy head of the examination bureau) and imperial scholar at Hongwen Institute (弘文館), and was put in charge of editing the imperial history.

In 836, with Li Guyan, a former chancellor, serving again as chancellor with Zheng and Li Shi, Li Shi advocated the posthumous rehabilitation of the former chancellor Song Shenxi, whom Wang Shoucheng and Zheng Zhu had previously accused of treason, leading to Song's exile. Zheng and Li Guyan joined Li Shi in his petition, and Emperor Wenzong agreed, restoring Song's offices posthumously.

By 838, Li Shi and Li Guyan were no longer chancellor, and serving with Zheng were Chen Yixing, Yang Sifu, and Li Jue. Soon, the chancellors were frequently arguing with each other, with Zheng and Chen (both of whom were considered Li Faction leaders) on one side and Yang and Li Jue (both of whom were considered Niu Faction leaders) on the other. For example, when Yang advocated for Li Zongmin, who was then forced to serve in the lowly post of military advisor to the prefect of Hengzhou (modern Hengyang in Hunan), to be promoted closer to the capital, Emperor Wenzong agreed, but Zheng opposed vehemently, stating as far that he would resign his chancellorship if Li Zongmin were promoted, leading to a heated argument between Yang and Zheng in Emperor Wenzong's presence. (In the aftermaths of the argument, Li Zongmin was made the prefect of Hang Prefecture (杭州, in modern Hangzhou, Zhejiang).) It was said that from that point on, every important decision became colored by factional politics, such that Emperor Wenzong could not rule on them easily. Late in 838, Zheng offered to resign. In response, Emperor Wenzong, while not accepting the resignation, allowed him to report to the Office of the Chancellors only once every three to five days.

In 839, there was another major argument between the chancellors that led to Zheng's and Chen's removal. Emperor Wenzong had praised the talents of the acting director of finances, Du Cong. Yang and Li Jue thereafter recommended Du to be the ministry of census. Chen responded, "Such orders should come from the Emperor. In the past, those who lost stately sovereignty did so by losing their authorities to their subjects." Li Jue responded, "Your Imperial Majesty had told me previously that an Emperor should select chancellors, not suspect them." In a subsequent discussion, Chen again emphasized that the Emperor should not yield authority to his subjects. Li Jue, offended, responded, "Chen Yixing is obviously suspecting that there are chancellors who are stealing power from Your Imperial Majesty. I have often requested retirement, and I would be fortunate to be given a post as an imperial prince's teacher." Zheng then stated, "Your Imperial Majesty ruled well in the first and second years of the Kaicheng era [(i.e., 836 and 837)], while less so in the third and fourth years of Kaicheng [(i.e., 838 and 839)]." Yang responded, "In the first and second years, Zheng Tan and Chen Yixing were in power. In the third and fourth years, your subject and Li Jue joined them. Of course, the crime is mine." He then stated, "I do not dare to again enter the Office of the Chancellors!" He withdrew from Emperor Wenzong's presence. Emperor Wenzong subsequently sent a eunuch to comfort him, and Zheng partially apologized, stating, "Your subject is foolish. I did not intend to point at Yang Sifu, but Yang Sifu's reaction shows that he has no tolerance for me." Yang responded, "Zheng Tan stated that the governance is deteriorating year by year. This does not only incriminate your subject, but also speaks ill of your holy virtues." Yang then submitted multiple offers to resign. Soon thereafter, Zheng and Chen were stripped of their chancellor posts, and Zheng was again made You Pushe.

== During Emperor Wuzong's reign ==
In 840, Emperor Wenzong died and was succeeded by his brother Emperor Wuzong. Soon thereafter, Li Deyu became chancellor and wanted to recommend Zheng Tan to serve as chancellor again, but Zheng declined, claiming a foot illness. In 842, he retired with the title of acting Situ (司徒, one of the Three Excellencies). He died that year.
