= Linghu Chu =

Tang Chinese official

Linghu Chu (Chinese: 令狐楚; pinyin: Línghú Chǔ) (766 – December 18, 837), courtesy name Keshi (殼士), posthumous name Duke Wen of Pengyang (彭陽文公), was an official of the Chinese Tang dynasty, serving as a chancellor during the reigns of Emperor Xianzong and (briefly) Emperor Xianzong's son Emperor Muzong.

== Background ==
Linghu Chu was born in 766, during the reign of Emperor Daizong. According to his biography in the Old Book of Tang, he "claimed to be" a descendant of the early-Tang dynasty historian Linghu Defen—with the language used in the biography indicating some skepticism. The claim of descendance from Linghu Defen was accepted without question in his biography in the New Book of Tang, although the lineage table of the chancellors' family trees in the New Book of Tang did not show a direct line from Linghu Defen. His grandfather Linghu Chongliang (令狐崇亮) served as a county magistrate, while, his father Linghu Chengjian (令狐承簡) served as an officer at the Taiyuan Municipality government. Linghu Chu had at least two younger brothers, Linghu Cong (令狐從) and Linghu Ding (令狐定). It was said that his family had a literary tradition, and even when Linghu Chu was a child, he studied literature.

== During Emperor Dezong's reign ==
Linghu Chu stood for the imperial examinations in his youth, and in 781, during the reign of Emperor Daizong's son Emperor Dezong, when Linghu was 15, he passed the imperial examinations. (Also among those passing the imperial examinations that year were Huangfu Bo and Xiao Mian, with whom he became friendly.) It was said that the governor of Gui District (桂管, headquartered in modern Guilin, Guangxi) Wang Gong (王拱) favored his talent and wanted to invite him to serve on staff. Concerned that Linghu would decline, he made the request to Emperor Dezong directly. As Linghu's father Linghu Chengjian was then still serving in Taiyuan, he wanted to stay in Taiyuan, but was thankful for Wang's high regard of him, so after he passed the imperial examinations he headed for Gui District's capital Guilin to thank Wang, but did not accept Wang's feasts and tours before he requested to return to Taiyuan to support his parents. As a result of his actions, he gained a good reputation. Later, as Li Shuo (李說), Yan Shou (嚴綬), and Zheng Dan (鄭儋) successively served as the military governor (jiedushi) of Hedong Circuit (河東), headquartered at Taiyuan, they had high opinions of Linghu Chu and thus invited him to serve on staff, and he eventually rose to be the military governor's assistant. It was said that Linghu was highly intelligent, and whenever Emperor Dezong received reports from the military governor of Hedong and could tell that it was Linghu who drafted them, he had much praise for Linghu's writing. In 801, when Zheng died suddenly without leaving instructions, the soldiers were disturbed and went into a near-mutiny state. In the middle of the night, a number of soldiers gathered and forced Linghu, under the threats by swords, to head to the headquarters. With the officers surrounding him, they ordered him to draft a final report for Zheng. Despite the duress of swords, Linghu had little trouble drafting such a report, and when the report was read to the soldiers, all were touched by his words, thus calming a serious situation. After his father died, he was known for his filial piety during the period of mourning. He thereafter was summoned to the capital Chang'an to serve as You Shiyi (右拾遺), a low-level consultant at the legislative bureau of government (中書省, Zhongshu Sheng), and thereafter served as Taichang Boshi (太常博士), a consultant at the ministry of worship (太常寺, Taichang Si) and Libu Yuanwailang (禮部員外郎), a low-level official at the ministry of rites (禮部, Libu). At some point, Linghu left governmental service to observe a period of mourning for his mother when she died. After the mourning period was over, he was recalled to governmental service to serve as Xingbu Yuanwailang (刑部員外郎), a low-level official at the ministry of justice (刑部, Xingbu).

== During Emperor Xianzong's reign ==
During the reign of Emperor Dezong's grandson Emperor Xianzong, Linghu was made Zhifang Yuanwailang (職方員外郎), a low-level official at the ministry of defense (兵部, Bingbu), but was put in charge of drafting edicts. As Linghu was friendly with Huangfu Bo and Xiao Mian, in 813, by which point Huangfu had gained Emperor Xianzong's favor by his enriching the palace treasury, both Xiao and Linghu were made imperial scholars (翰林學士, Hanlin Xueshi). Linghu was subsequently also promoted in his regular duties to be Zhifang Langzhong (職方郎中), a supervisorial official at the ministry of defense, and then Zhongshu Sheren (中書舍人), a mid-level official at the legislative bureau.

As of 817, Emperor Xianzong was engaging a campaign against the warlord Wu Yuanji, who controlled Zhangyi Circuit (彰義, headquartered in modern Zhumadian, Henan). The chancellor Li Fengji, whom Linghu was friendly to, opposed the campaign, but Emperor Xianzong's campaign was supported by the chancellor Pei Du, who volunteered to head to the front to oversee the campaign. Before Pei's departure from Chang'an, as he was concerned that Li and Linghu would work together to impede the campaign, he accused Linghu of using inappropriate language in his (Pei's) commissioning edict. Linghu was thus relieved of his duties as imperial scholar and drafter of imperial edicts, although he remained Zhongshu Sheren.

In summer 818, Linghu was sent out of Chang'an to serve as the prefect of Hua Prefecture (華州, in modern Weinan, Shaanxi). In winter 818, by which time Huangfu was a chancellor, Linghu was made the military governor of Heyang Circuit (河陽, headquartered in modern Jiaozuo, Henan), succeeding Wu Chongyin, who was made the military governor of Henghai Circuit (橫海, headquartered in modern Cangzhou, Hebei). Wu took 3,000 Heyang soldiers with him as he was reporting to Henghai, but the Heyang soldiers did not want to leave their home, and therefore, on the way, deserted and headed back to Heyang. As they reached Heyang's capital, they did not dare to enter, and they were set to pillage the area. Linghu happened to be arriving at that time, and he went to see them without guards, comforting them and persuading them to return to headquarters with him.

In 819, after Pei was sent out of the capital to serve as the military governor of Hedong, Huangfu recommended Linghu. Linghu was thereafter recalled to Chang'an and made Zhongshu Shilang (中書侍郎), the deputy head of the legislative bureau, as well as chancellor de facto with the title Tong Zhongshu Menxia Pingzhangshi (同中書門下平章事). Shortly after taking up his position, Linghu was presented with a collection of poetry written by the writer and poet Yuan Zhen. Linghu had been Yan's patron since at least 809. Late in the year, there was an incident in which his subordinate Wu Ruheng (武儒衡), who was much respected by Emperor Xianzong, was rumored to be ready to be chancellor. Linghu was apprehensive of Wu, and therefore tried to find some way to damage Wu's reputation. As Wu was a descendant of Wu Pingyi (武平一), a relative of Wu Zetian, who seized the throne and interrupted Tang earlier in the dynasty's history, he recommended Di Jianmo (狄兼謨), a relative of Di Renjie, a chancellor of Wu Zetian's time, for a promotion—and, as he was drafting the edict to declare Di's promotion, wrote a in flowery language that deprecated Wu Zetian as an usurper and praised Di Renjie for protecting her son and heir apparent Emperor Zhongzong. This drew a teary defense by Wu Ruheng of his ancestor Wu Pingyi, who had declined the posts that Wu Zetian gave him, and caused Emperor Xianzong to view Linghu poorly, although Linghu remained chancellor.

== During Emperor Muzong's reign ==
In 820, Emperor Xianzong died and was succeeded by his son Emperor Muzong. Emperor Muzong immediately exiled Huangfu Bo and initially wanted to execute him. Xiao Mian, whom Emperor Muzong made chancellor at Linghu's recommendation, interceded, however, along with eunuchs, and Huangfu was spared. Meanwhile, the other officials who had long resented Huangfu also resented Linghu for his involvement with Huangfu, but did not dare at that point to act against Linghu, on Xiao's account. However, subsequently, as Linghu was responsible for overseeing the construction of Emperor Xianzong's tomb and drafting his mourning text, Linghu's close associates were accused of corruption, and Linghu was thereafter demoted to be the governor (觀察使, Guanchashi) of Xuanshe Circuit (宣歙, headquartered in modern Xuancheng, Anhui). Shortly after, those associates of his were executed, and Linghu was further demoted to be the prefect of Hengzhou (modern Hengyang in Hunan). (However, during the later rule of Emperor Muzong's younger brother Emperor Xuanzong, Emperor Xuanzong would recall a memory that he had that, during Emperor Xianzong's funeral processing, all of the officials and palace ladies dispersed during a storm, but Linghu faithfully held onto Emperor Xianzong's casket—with then-chancellor Bai Minzhong confirming Emperor Xuanzong's recollection of the event; it was because of this memory that Emperor Xuanzong eventually promoted Linghu's son Linghu Tao to be chancellor.) At that time, Linghu Chu's former rival Yuan Zhen was well-trusted by Emperor Muzong, and Yuan had long disliked Huangfu and Linghu's governance. Yuan drafted an edict that condemned Linghu severely, and thereafter Linghu bore a hatred for Yuan.

In 821, Linghu was moved to be the prefect of Ying Prefecture (郢州, in modern Wuhan, Hubei). He was then made an advisor to the Crown Prince but with his office set at the eastern capital Luoyang. In 822, he was initially set to be made the governor of Shanguo Circuit (陝虢, headquartered in modern Sanmenxia, Henan) and the secretary general of its capital Shan Prefecture (陝州), when the advisorial officials submitted petitions arguing that due to Linghu's past faults, he should not be allowed to serve as a governor. Emperor Muzong thus rescinded LInghu's commission, and Linghu, who had already arrived at Shan Prefecture and started ruling the circuit, was removed after serving one day. He was instead again made advisor to the Crown Prince and returned to Luoyang. After Li Fengji became chancellor again later that year, he worked for Linghu's restoration, but was thwarted by Emperor Muzong's trusted advisor Li Shen (李紳).

== During Emperor Jingzong's reign ==
In 824, after Emperor Muzong died and was succeeded by his son Emperor Jingzong, at Li Fengji's instigation, Li Shen was exiled. Linghu was subsequently made the mayor of Henan Municipality (河南, i.e., the Luoyang region). Later that year, he was made the military governor of Xuanwu Circuit (宣武, headquartered in modern Kaifeng, Henan) and the prefect of its capital Bian Prefecture (汴州). The Xuanwu soldiers had long been difficult to govern and had expelled several military governors. In reaction, Han Hong and his brother Han Chong (韓充), both of whom had served as military governors of Xuanwu, governed with a heavy hand. Linghu, instead, governed more gently, and in doing so comforted both soldiers and the people. In the preface to the collection of Linghu's literary works, the ninth-century thinker Liu Yuxi described Linghu's time as military governor:

Linghu from the start regulated himself with purity and honesty. He treated others with kindness and trust. He eliminated the doubts of the many with evenhandedness. He eliminated the harsh enforcement of law with ritual and deference. From above, he transformed those below, and [his influence] quickly spread. He changed the sound in the Confucian temple, and there were none who returned to their old habits.

There was a precedent that military governors of Xuanwu were given large stipends, but Linghu declined it.

== During Emperor Wenzong's reign ==
In 828, by which time Emperor Jingzong's brother Emperor Wenzong was emperor, Linghu Chu was recalled to Chang'an to serve as minister of census (戶部尚書, Hubu Shangshu). In 829, he was again sent to Luoyang to serve as Luoyang's defender. Later that year, he was made the military governor of Tianping Circuit (天平, headquartered in modern Tai'an, Shandong) as well as the prefect of its capital Yun Prefecture (鄆州). That year, there was a severe drought, such that in some places people were committing cannibalism. Linghu spread the wealth to try to relieve the disaster, and it was said that although Tianping was afflicted, there were no waves of refugees leaving Tianping. In 832, he was made the military governor of Hedong and the mayor of Taiyuan. As he was a long-time resident of Taiyuan, he knew the people's customs, and it was said that despite a drought there as well, there were no waves of refugees. He was welcomed by the people of the region. In 833, he was recalled to Chang'an to serve as the minister of civil service affairs (吏部尚書, LIbu Shangshu) and acting You Pushe (右僕射), one of the heads of the executive bureau (尚書省, Shangshu Sheng). As minister of civil service affairs, he was of the third rank, but at that time, it was customary that acting officers, at imperial meetings, stood in places where the ranks of their acting officers applied, and You Pushe was second rank. Linghu believed this to be inappropriate, and he proposed that he stand with third-rank officials. Emperor Wenzong issued an edict praising him. In 835, he was made the minister of worship (太常卿, Taichang Qing). In 836, he was made acting Zuo Pushe (左僕射), the other head of the executive bureau, and created the Duke of Pengyang.

Later that year, when the Ganlu Incident erupted (as Emperor Wenzong's trusted chancellor Li Xun and close associate Zheng Zhu carried out a failed attempt to massacre the eunuchs and were themselves killed, along with the chancellors Wang Ya, Jia Su, and Shu Yuanyu on accusations of treason) Linghu and his Pushe colleague Zheng Tan were called to the palace. They were set to be made chancellors, but when the powerful eunuchs, led by Qiu Shiliang, had Linghu draft an edict to accuse Wang and Jia of treason, Linghu did so—but wrote in empty language that showed that he sympathized with Wang and Jia. This displeased Qiu, and therefore, Li Shi was made chancellor instead. Linghu was subsequently given the additional office as director of salt and iron monopolies and grain supplies. As part of his responsibilities, he oversaw the collection of the tea tax that Zheng Zhu had instituted, which had drawn much resentment from the people. Linghu requested that the tea tax be abolished, and subsequently it was. Also at his suggestion, the customs that whenever military governors were commissioned, that they would take armed guards and pay homage to the minister of defense before departing Chang'an be abolished (as the customs were used as part of Li Xun's and Zheng Zhu's plot). Also at his request, the silk that was set to be used in the repairs of Qujiang Pavilion (曲江亭) were diverted to repairing the office of the chancellors, which lay in ruins after the Ganlu Incident.

In 836, there was an imperial feast held at Qujiang Pavilion. Linghu, finding a feast to be inappropriate in light of the massacre of the officials that had just occurred, refused to attend by claiming an illness, and the popular sentiment at the time praised him. He also found a chance to get Emperor Wenzong to approve the burial of the bodies of Wang and the other officials killed in the Ganlu Incident—which had been exposed to the elements after their execution. (Qiu, however, subsequently had the bodies disinterred and thrown into the Wei River.) Soon thereafter, the military governor of Shannan West Circuit (山南西道, headquartered in modern Hanzhong, Shaanxi), Li Guyan, was recalled to Chang'an to serve as chancellor, and Linghu was sent out to serve as the military governor of Shannan West as well as the mayor of its capital Xingyuan Municipality (興元). He died in 837, while still serving at Shannan West. He was given posthumous honors. It was said that even when he was near death, he behaved with elegance, and he submitted a final petition begging Emperor Wenzong (in reality, begging the eunuchs who by that point had Emperor Wenzong effectively under their control) for mercy on people who had been accused of crimes; in drafting his final petition, he was assisted by his staff member Li Shangyin. He left a 100-volume collection of his writings, and his mourning text for Emperor Xianzong was particularly praised for its engaging use of language.

== Notes and references ==
- Old Book of Tang, vol. 172.
- New Book of Tang, vol. 166.
- Zizhi Tongjian, vols. 236, 240, 241, 245.
