= Liu Congjian =

Liu Congjian (Chinese: 劉從諫) (803–843), formally the Duke of Pei (沛公), was a Chinese military general and politician of the Tang dynasty who is most known for his term as the military governor (jiedushi) of Zhaoyi Circuit (昭義, headquartered in modern Changzhi, Shanxi), during which he was viewed as a warlord who maintained a tight hold on the circuit but also as someone who served as a counterbalance to the eunuchs who controlled the imperial government.

== Background and early career ==
Liu Congjian was born in 803, during the reign of Emperor Dezong. His father Liu Wu was then serving as an officer under Li Shigu the military governor of Pinglu Circuit (平盧, headquartered in modern Tai'an, Shandong), who ruled the circuit in de facto independence from the imperial government.

As of 819, Li Shigu's brother and successor Li Shidao was in a war against the imperial government, then under the rule of Emperor Dezong's grandson Emperor Xianzong, and the imperial forces were converging on Pinglu. He commissioned Liu Wu to command troops to resist the forces commanded by Tian Hongzheng, the military governor of Weibo Circuit (魏博, in modern Handan, Hebei). To endear himself to Liu Wu, he had Liu Congjian made a junior officer at his headquarters. However, Liu Wu was repeatedly losing battles to Tian, and Li became suspicious of Liu Wu's intentions. At one point, Li decided to have Liu Wu executed, so he recalled Liu Wu from Yanggu (陽穀, in modern Liaocheng, Shandong), where his troops were stationed, under the guise of consultation, intending to execute Liu Wu when he got to the circuit capital Yun Prefecture (鄆州). Once Liu Wu arrived, however, Li, being counseled by some that executing Liu Wu without evidence of treachery so would destroy morale, changed his mind, and he sent Liu Wu back to Yanggu and gave Liu Wu much treasure. Meanwhile, Liu Congjian, who spent much time with Li's servants, was able to learn what had happened, and informed all of it to his father.

Soon thereafter, Li became resolved to kill Liu Wu. He sent two messengers to Liu's deputy Zhang Xian (張暹), ordering Zhang to execute Liu and take over the army. When the messengers informed Zhang, Zhang, who was friendly with Liu, secretly informed Liu, who immediately put the two messengers to death. Liu then called a meeting with all of his officers, declaring that he was set to turn against Li Shidao and follow imperial orders. When some officers hesitated, he executed them, as well as a number of others that soldiers had resented. The other officers were intimidated into submission. At night, they launched a surprise attack on Yun Prefecture, and the Yun Prefecture defenders, believing that Liu was returning on Li Shidao's orders, allowed them in. Liu Wu controlled the city and arrested Li and his two sons, putting them to death. He then sent messengers to surrender to Tian. To reward Liu for his actions, Emperor Xianzong made Liu the military governor of Yicheng Circuit (義成, headquartered in modern Anyang, Henan).

Liu Wu was initially obedient to the imperial government, and continued to be after he was transferred to Zhaoyi Circuit in 820, by which time Emperor Xianzong's son Emperor Muzong was emperor. However, after an incident where the imperial eunuch monitor of the army, Liu Chengjie (劉承偕), conspired with Liu Wu's subordinate Zhang Wen (張汶) to seize control of Zhangyi, Liu Wu killed Zhang and arrested Liu Chengjie. While, under the counsel of his staffer Jia Zhiyan (賈直言), Liu Wu returned Liu Chengjie to the imperial government, he subsequently began to rule Zhaoyi semi-independently from the imperial government.

Liu Wu died suddenly in 825. Liu Congjian initially did not announce his death except to the 2,000 soldiers that Liu Wu had brought from Pinglu Circuit initially and, after consulting with the officer Liu Wude (劉武德), submitted a petition in Liu Wu's name requesting that Liu Congjian be allowed to succeed him. Jia, however, rebuked Liu Congjian and pointed out that it was improper for him not to publicly mourn his father. Liu Congjian had no response, and so publicly declared Liu Wu's death. When the imperial government, then ruled by Emperor Muzong's son Emperor Jingzong, received the petition in Liu Wu's name, there was much debate among the imperial officials. The former chancellor Li Jiang advocated that the request be denied, and that Liu Congjian be placated by making him a prefect. However, the chancellor Li Fengji and the powerful eunuch Wang Shoucheng, who opined otherwise, prevailed, and Emperor Jingzong made Liu Congjian the acting military governor, and soon thereafter made him military governor. It was said that while Liu Wu was tedious and harsh, Liu Congjian was lenient and graceful toward the soldiers, and the soldiers supported him.

== As military governor ==
In 829, when Shi Xiancheng the military governor of Weibo, who had governed his circuit in de facto independence from the imperial government, offered to surrender control of Weibo, the imperial government commissioned Li Ting (李聽) as the new military governor of Weibo. However, Shi's soldiers opposed, and they mutinied, killing Shi. When Li Ting subsequently arrived, the Weibo soldiers, under the leadership of He Jintao, launched a surprise attack on him, inflicting much casualties and forcing him to flee. Liu Congjian launched an army and saved Li Ting. For this achievement, Liu was created the Duke of Pei.

It was said that Liu had intended to be faithful to the imperial government, and in 832, he visited the capital Chang'an to pay homage to then-ruling Emperor Wenzong (Emperor Jingzong's younger brother), with the intent to request a transfer (i.e., to surrender control of Zhaoyi Circuit). However, when he got to the capital, he saw that the imperial government lacked direction, and many imperial officials made improper requests to him. He thus lost the respect he had for the imperial government, and never made the transfer request. Instead, in early 833, Emperor Wenzong conferred an honorific chancellor title of Tong Zhongshu Menxia Pingzhangshi (同中書門下平章事) on him and allowed him to return to Zhaoyi.

Later in 833, Yang Yuanqing (楊元卿) the military governor of Xuanwu Circuit (宣武, headquartered in modern Kaifeng, Henan) fell ill, and the imperial government was determining a successor for him. The chancellor Li Deyu suggested that Liu be transferred to Xuanwu, to end his family's hold on Zhaoyi. Emperor Wenzong did not find the timing appropriate, and declined the suggestion, instead making the former chancellor Li Cheng the military governor of Xuanwu.

In 835, Emperor Wenzong, in an attempt to regain power from the powerful eunuchs, who commanded the imperial guards, conspired with the chancellor Li Xun and the general Zheng Zhu to have the eunuchs slaughtered. When the eunuchs discovered the plot, Li Xun, Zheng, and many other officials were slaughtered, including the other chancellors Wang Ya, Jia Su, and Shu Yuanyu, and effectively put Emperor Wenzong under house arrest. Liu, who had been friendly with Wang, protected the slaughtered officials' family members who fled to Zhaoyi. He further submitted harshly-worded petitions to the imperial government, openly questioning whether the slaughtered officials committed any crimes at all. The eunuchs tried to placate Liu by giving him the honorific title of acting Situ (司徒, one of the Three Excellencies), but Liu's petitions continued, and he eventually submitted four, continuing to call for the chancellors' posthumous rehabilitation. It was said that it was only after Liu's petitions that the powerful eunuchs, led by Qiu Shiliang, became apprehensive and allowed Emperor Wenzong, as well as the new chancellors Zheng Tan and Li Shi, to exercise some of their authorities.

In 839, in the midst of a controversy as to which of two claimants, Xiao Ben (蕭本) and Xiao Hong (蕭弘), if either at all, was the true long-lost brother of Emperor Wenzong's mother Empress Dowager Xiao, after Xiao Ben was judged to be Empress Dowager Xiao's brother, Xiao Hong fled to Zhaoyi and requested help from Liu. Liu submitted a petition on Xiao Hong's behalf. Emperor Wenzong ordered a new investigation, which concluded that neither Xiao Ben nor Xiao Hong was Empress Dowager Xiao's brother; both were exiled. Meanwhile, Liu continued to accuse Qiu of crimes, while Qiu accused Liu of having designs against the imperial government. After Emperor Wenzong died in 840 and was succeeded by his brother Emperor Wuzong, Liu offered a large horse to Emperor Wuzong, who declined the tribute. Liu believed that Qiu was the one who persuaded Emperor Wenzong not to accept the tribute and, in anger, killed the horse, and this act drew further suspicions from the imperial government. It was further said that Liu armed his circuit and conducted commerce to gather wealth such that the neighboring circuits were jealous of and suspicious of him.

In 843, Liu fell ill, and he commented to his wife Lady Pei:

I serve the imperial court with faithfulness, but the imperial court does not understand my intent, and the neighboring circuits are not friendly to us. After I die, if someone else came to succeed me, our family will not even have smoke remaining from its chimney.

Liu thus wanted to have his nephew Liu Zhen (whom he adopted as his son. According to Liu Congjian's biography in the New Book of Tang, Liu Congjian had some 20 sons, but they were all still children at the time of his death) succeed him. He planned with a number of staff members on how to induce the imperial government into allowing the succession, but before the preparations could be complete, Liu Congjian died. Liu Zhen's request to succeed him was subsequently denied, and Emperor Wuzong, under the advocacy of Li Deyu, ordered a general campaign against Zhaoyi, eventually defeating Liu Zhen and slaughtering the Liu family. Liu Congjian's body was disinterred, exposed in the street for three days, and then cut into pieces.

== Notes and references ==
- Old Book of Tang, vol. 161.
- New Book of Tang, vol. 214.
- Zizhi Tongjian, vols. 241, 242, 243, 244, 245, 246, 247, 248.
