= Qiu Shiliang =

Qiu Shiliang (仇士良) (died 843), courtesy name Kuangmei (匡美), formally the Duke of Chu (楚公), was an eunuch official of the Chinese dynasty Tang dynasty, becoming particularly powerful after the Ganlu Incident—an event in which Emperor Wenzong tried, but failed, to seize power back from powerful eunuchs by slaughtering them.

== Background and early career ==
It is not known when Qiu Shiliang was born, but it was known that he was from Xun Prefecture (循州, in modern Huizhou, Guangdong). During the brief reign of Emperor Shunzong (805), Qiu became a servant to Emperor Shunzong's crown prince Li Chun, and after Li Chun became emperor later that year (as Emperor Xianzong), he became an imperial attendant, and later served as the eunuch monitor of the army to such circuits as Pinglu (平盧, headquartered in modern Weifang, Shandong) and Fengxiang (鳳翔, headquartered in modern Baoji, Shaanxi). On an occasion, when both he and the imperial censor Yuan Zhen happened to be at the imperial messenger outpost Fushui (敷水, in modern Weinan, Shaanxi), he and Yuan got into a dispute over who had the right to use the main bedroom at the outpost, and he battered and injured Yuan. After the incident, Yuan's superior, the deputy chief imperial censor Wang Bo proposed that the matter be handled per the previous formal policy that whenever an imperial censor and an imperial messenger arrived at the same location, the one who arrived first should have precedence. Emperor Xianzong, favoring Qiu, demoted Yuan, rather than to look further into the matter. Through the rest of Emperor Xianzong's reign and the reigns of his son Emperor Muzong and grandson Emperor Jingzong, Qiu often served as the director of the imperial servants (五坊使, Wufangshi), and it was said that he was harsh to the people, often allowing his subordinates to pillage them.

Around new year 827, Emperor Jingzong was assassinated by a group of eunuchs and officers resentful of his harsh temperament. The conspirators initially tried to make Emperor Muzong's brother Li Wu the Prince of Jiàng emperor, but another group of eunuchs—led by the directors of palace communications Wang Shoucheng and Yang Chenghe (楊承和) and the commanders of the Shence Armies Wei Congjian (魏從簡) and Liang Shouqian (梁守謙), and Qiu, who was then a general of the Shence Army as well, was a part of this group—attacked the conspirators, killing them and Li Wu. This group of eunuchs made Emperor Jingzong's younger brother Li Han the Prince of Jiāng (note different tone) emperor (as Emperor Wenzong). Despite Qiu's participation in the counterattack, however, because Wang suppressed Qiu, Qiu was not rewarded, and from this point on he resented Wang.

== During Emperor Wenzong's reign ==
=== Before the Ganlu Incident ===
As of 835, Emperor Wenzong was conspiring with the officials Zheng Zhu and Li Xun to slaughter the powerful eunuchs. They first wanted to target Wang Shoucheng, and as they knew that Wang and Qiu Shiliang were enemies, in summer 835 Emperor Wenzong made Qiu the commander of the Left Shence Army so that he would divert Wang's authority. Subsequently, after Wang retired, Emperor Wenzong had the eunuch Li Haogu (李好古) send poisoned wine to Wang, and Wang died shortly thereafter.

=== The Ganlu Incident ===
Wang Shoucheng's death, however, was only a small part of Emperor Wenzong's planning with Zheng Zhu and Li Xun—they planned to use the occasion of Wang's funeral to gather the eunuchs, and then have Zheng's troops (as Zheng was then the military governor (jiedushi) of Fengxiang Circuit) slaughter them. (Unknown to Zheng and Emperor Wenzong, Li Xun had, by this point, grown jealous of Zheng as well, and so was instead gathering troops commanded by his associates Guo Xingyu (郭行餘), Wang Fan (王璠), Luo Liyan (羅立言), Han Yue (韓約), and Li Xiaoben (李孝本) to carry out the slaughter; he planned to, after the slaughter, kill Zheng as well.)

On December 14, 835, six days before the scheduled funeral for Wang, Han reported to Emperor Wenzong, at the imperial meeting hall Zichen Hall (紫宸殿), that there had been sweet dew (甘露, ganlu in Chinese) that appeared on a pomegranate tree outside the headquarters of Zuo Jinwu (左金吾), one of the Wei Army (衛軍) headquarters—viewed as a sign of divine favor. Emperor Wenzong then went to nearby Hanyuan Hall (含元殿) and ordered the imperial officials, including Li Xun, to examine the purported sweet dew. Li Xun soon returned and stated that it appeared that there was no sweet dew; at Li Xun's suggestion, Emperor Wenzong ordered Qiu and his fellow Shence Army commander Yu Hongzhi (魚弘志) to lead the eunuchs in examining the sweet dew. When Qiu and Yu arrived at the Zuo Jinwu headquarters, however, Han had lost his composure, and Qiu realized that something was wrong when he saw soldiers converging and the noise of weapons clanging. He and the other eunuchs immediately ran back to Hanyuan Hall and seized Emperor Wenzong. The soldiers under Luo and Li Xiaoben battled the eunuchs, killing a number of them, but the eunuchs were able to escort Emperor Wenzong back to the imperial palace. Knowing that he had lost this gambit, Li Xun fled.

Once the eunuchs took Emperor Wenzong back to the palace, they realized that Emperor Wenzong was complicit in this plot to slaughter them, and they cursed him and held him. Qiu then ordered the Shence Army officers Liu Tailun (劉泰倫) and Wei Zhongqing (魏仲卿) to search and arrest Li Xun. The Shence Army soldiers took this chance to slaughter many imperial officials and Wei Army soldiers. Eventually, Li Xun and his conspirators were found and executed, along with the chancellors Wang Ya, Jia Su, and Shu Yuanyu, who were not involved in the plot but whom Qiu and the other eunuchs held responsible as well. At Qiu's order, Zheng was killed by the eunuch monitor of Fengxiang, Zhang Zhongqing (張仲卿). From this point on, Qiu was the leading figure at the imperial court, with even Emperor Wenzong under the eunuchs' control. Qiu was given an honorary general title as well as the honorific title of Tejin (特進).

=== After the Ganlu Incident ===
From thereon, few officials dared to stand up to Qiu Shiliang, although late in 835, there was an incident in which Xue Yuanshang (薛元賞) the mayor of Jingzhao Municipality (京兆, i.e., the region of the capital Chang'an) executed a Shence Army officer who was being disrespectful to the chancellor Li Shi, and then met Qiu to apologize. Qiu, knowing that the officer could not be brought back to life, feasted with Xue. In 836, Qiu suggested that Shence Army soldiers guard the palace, instead of the Jinwu Corps (i.e., Zuo Jinwu and You Jinwu), but at the opposition of the advisory official Feng Ding (馮定), Qiu's suggestion was not carried out. At one point, Qiu and Yu Hongzhi were so resentful of Emperor Wenzong that they considered deposing him. They summoned the imperial scholar Cui Shenyou (崔慎由) and asked him to draft an edict in the name of Emperor Wenzong's grandmother Grand Empress Dowager Guo deposing Emperor Wenzong on excuses of his being too ill to govern. Cui resisted, pointing out that it would be inappropriate and that he was willing to risk his own life, but not those of his household of 300 people (i.e., if he committed treason, his household would be slaughtered). Qiu and Yu then led Cui to Emperor Wenzong and, in Cui's presence, made various accusations against Emperor Wenzong, and Emperor Wenzong did not dare to respond. Qiu then stated, "If it were not for the imperial scholar, you would not be allowed to remain on this throne." At Qiu's order, Cui kept this matter secret, but wrote secret records of this incident and left them for his son Cui Yin. (It was said that it was because of this incident that Cui Yin, who would later become chancellor under Emperor Zhaozong, was determined to exterminate eunuchs.)

In spring 836, at the suggestion of the senior official Linghu Chu, Emperor Wenzong ordered that Wang Ya and the other executed officials, whose bodies had been exposed to the elements, be properly buried. Qiu, however, secretly sent soldiers to dig up their bodies and throw the bodies into the Wei River.

Meanwhile, Qiu continued to be largely the power controlling the policies at this point. However, after Liu Congjian the military governor of Zhaoyi Circuit (昭義, headquartered in modern Changzhi, Shanxi) submitted several petitions that, in harsh language, defended Wang and accused Qiu and other eunuchs of crimes, Qiu and the other eunuchs began to be apprehensive, and allowed Emperor Wenzong and the chancellors Li Shi and Zheng Tan more room to govern. Soon thereafter, however, there was an incident when there were rumors that Emperor Wenzong was prepared to give the chancellors commands of the armies to again act against the eunuchs, and tensions rose again. It was only after Li Shi proposed that Emperor Wenzong convene a meeting between the chancellors and the eunuchs, allowing Li Shi and Zheng to explain what was happening to the eunuchs, that Qiu and the others were less suspicious of the chancellors.

Meanwhile, Qiu had been resentful of the military governor of Fufang Circuit (鄜坊, headquartered in modern Yan'an, Shaanxi), Xiao Hong (蕭洪)—who was not a real brother of Emperor Wenzong's mother Empress Dowager Xiao but pretended to be and therefore received official commissions—because Xiao had ingratiated Li Xun and, under Li Xun's protection, had refused to pay bribes that his predecessor had promised to pay the officers of the Shence Armies. Qiu found out that Xiao was not really Empress Dowager Xiao's brother and exposed his deceit; Xiao was exiled and, on the way, ordered to commit suicide.

As Li Shi had been willing to stand up to the eunuchs on policy issues, Qiu began to resent him deeply. In 838, Qiu sent assassins to try to kill Li Shi, but the assassination failed. Despite the failure, Li Shi became fearful and offered to resign his chancellor position. Emperor Wenzong reluctantly agreed, making Li Shi the military governor of Jingnan Circuit (荊南, headquartered in modern Jingzhou, Hubei) instead.

Meanwhile, as Emperor Wenzong's son and crown prince Li Yong died in 838, a question arose as to who would succeed Emperor Wenzong. Emperor Wenzong's favorite concubine Consort Yang supported Emperor Wenzong's younger brother Li Rong the Prince of An, but after opposition by the chancellor Li Jue, Emperor Wenzong created Emperor Jingzong's son Li Chengmei the Prince of Chen crown prince. When Emperor Wenzong became deathly ill in spring 840, he had his trusted eunuchs Liu Hongyi (劉弘逸) and Xue Jileng (薛季稜) summon the chancellors Li Jue and Yang Sifu to the palace, preparing to entrust Li Chengmei to them. Qiu and Yu, however, opposed Li Chengmei, as Emperor Wenzong did not consult them before making Li Chengmei crown prince. They discussed with Li Jue and Yang the possibility of changing the crown prince and, despite Li Jue's opposition, issued an edict in Emperor Wenzong's name deposing Li Chengmei and creating Emperor Wenzong's younger brother Li Chan the Prince of Ying crown prince instead. Soon thereafter, Emperor Wenzong died. At Qiu's urging, Li Chan, even before he would officially take the throne, ordered Consort Yang, Li Rong, and Li Chengmei to commit suicide. It was said that this point, Qiu and the other powerful eunuchs resented Emperor Wenzong so much that any eunuchs and musicians whom Emperor Wenzong favored were being executed and exiled en masse. Soon, Li Chan formally took the throne (as Emperor Wuzong).

== During Emperor Wuzong's reign ==
Qiu Shiliang continued to be powerful, initially, in Emperor Wuzong's administration. Emperor Wuzong created him the Duke of Chu. In 840, there was an incident in which Qiu requested that, per Tang regulations that high-level officials be allowed to recommend their sons for official service, his adopted son become an officer for the imperial guards. The imperial attendant Li Zhongmin (李中敏) opposed the request, stating, in provocative language, "Of course, Kaifu [(one of the honorific titles that Qiu held)] qualified one to recommend one's son, but how can an eunuch have a son?" Qiu was insulted and angered, and the new chancellor Li Deyu, who resented Yang Sifu (whom Emperor Wuzong had exiled by this point), believed that Li Zhongmin was an associate of Yang's, and therefore had Li Zhongmin exiled.

Meanwhile, Qiu resented Liu Hongyi and Xue Jileng for their close association with Emperor Wenzong. Qiu therefore repeatedly made accusations against them, as well as Yang and Li Jue. In 841 Emperor Wuzong ordered Liu and Xue to commit suicide and, initially, was set to send eunuchs to Tan Prefecture (in modern Changsha, Hunan, where Yang was then serving as governor of Hunan Circuit (湖南)) and Gui Prefecture (桂州, in modern Guilin, Guangxi, where Li Jue was then serving as the governor of Gui District (桂管)), to order Yang and Li Jue to commit suicide as well. At the intercession of Li Deyu and his fellow chancellors Cui Gong, Cui Dan, and Chen Yixing, Yang and Li Jue were spared their lives, but were further demoted and exiled.

In fall 841, Qiu was given the additional title of the monitor of the Shence Armies (觀軍容使, Guanjunrongshi). However, he began to resent Li Deyu for Li Deyu's hold on power as well. In 842, when Emperor Wuzong was planning to issue a general pardon, rumors got to Qiu that, as part of the edict, the chancellors and the director of finances were planning to reduce Shence Army's clothing and food stipends, Qiu publicly declared, "If this occurred, when the pardon is declared, the soldiers will gather in front of Danfeng Tower [(丹鳳樓, the tower from which emperors declared pardons)] and demonstrate!" Emperor Wuzong, angered by the remarks, sent eunuchs to rebuke Qiu and the other Shence Army officers for spreading rumors, and Qiu apologized.

Throughout the years, Qiu and Liu Congjian continued to have an adversarial relationship, as Liu repeatedly accused Qiu of crimes, and Qiu repeatedly accused Liu of plotting to rebel against the imperial government. On one occasion, Liu offered Emperor Wuzong a large horse as a tribute, but Emperor Wuzong did not accept it and returned it to Liu. Liu believed that Emperor Wuzong rejected the horse at Qiu's suggestion and, in anger, killed the horse. Thereafter, Liu acted effectively independently from the imperial government. In 843, when Liu fell ill, he wanted to have his adopted son Liu Zhen (the biological son of his brother Liu Congsu (劉從素) and therefore his biological nephew) inherit Zhaoyi Circuit. When Emperor Wuzong subsequently refused the request after Liu Congjian's death and instead ordered Liu Zhen to escort Liu Congjian's casket to the eastern capital Luoyang, Liu Zhen resisted, citing the adversarial relationship between Liu Congjian and Qiu as the reason why he did not dare to leave Zhaoyi Circuit. Emperor Wuzong thus declared a campaign against Liu Zhen. (Eventually, the imperial government would prevail in 845, after Qiu himself had died.)

Meanwhile, although Emperor Wuzong outwardly honored Qiu, he actually was suspicious of and despised Qiu. Realizing this, Qiu claimed to be ill and requested to be given less important offices. Emperor Wuzong agreed. Qiu then retired in summer 843. It was said that when he was retiring, the other eunuchs escorted him back to his mansion, and he advised them:

Do not let the Son of Heaven be without something to do. Keep him occupied with a life of luxury and pleasures, with enjoyment for his eyes and ears. We further need to find new methods to keep him freshened, so that he would not have time to do other things. This would be the only way for our will to be done. No matter what, do not let him study or be close to the scholars. If he studied histories of past dynasties, he will be concerned, and he will not be close to us.

The other eunuchs thanked him and bowed to him before leaving.

Qiu died later that year. In 844, however, other eunuchs reported to Emperor Wuzong of Qiu's crimes. Emperor Wuzong had Qiu's mansion searched, and several thousand sets of armors were found. Emperor Wuzong had Qiu posthumously stripped of his titles, and his assets were confiscated.

== Notes and references ==
- New Book of Tang, vol. 207.
- Zizhi Tongjian, vols. 245, 246, 247.
