= Waist chop =

Archaic Chinese form of execution

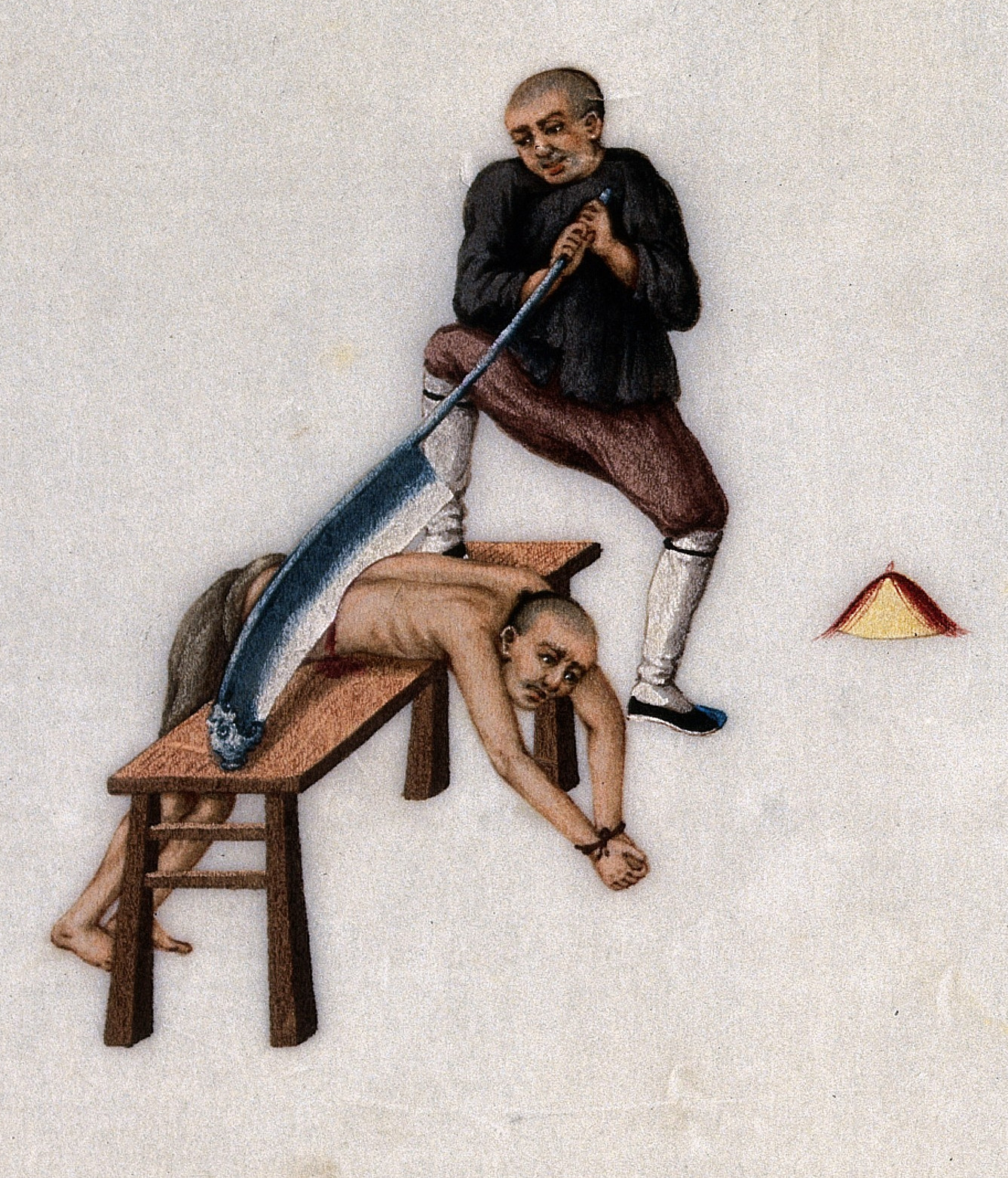
A prisoner is executed on a wooden bench with a large blade.

Waist chop or waist cutting (simplified Chinese: 腰斩; traditional Chinese: 腰斬; pinyin: Yāo zhǎn), also known as cutting in two at the waist, was a form of execution used in ancient China. As its name implies, it involved the condemned being sliced in two at the waist by an executioner.

== History ==
Waist chopping first appeared during the Zhou dynasty (c. 1046 BC – 256 BC). There were three forms of execution used in the Zhou dynasty: chēliè (車裂; tearing apart by tying the arms and legs to carts moving in opposite directions), zhǎn (斬; waist chop), and shā (殺; beheading). Sometimes, the chopping was not limited to one slice.

The first Ming dynasty emperor Zhu Yuanzhang sentenced the poet Gao Qi to be sliced into eight parts for his politically satirical writing.

In the modern Chinese language, "waist chop" has evolved to become a metaphor for the cancellation of an ongoing project, especially cancellation of television programs.

== Notable people sentenced to waist chop ==
- Li Si (Qin)
- Chao Cuo (Han)
- Gongsun Ao (Han)
- Liu Qumao (劉屈氂) (Han)
- Ren An (任安) (Han)
- Yang Yun (楊惲; maternal grandson of Sima Qian) (Han)
- Yu Fang (虞放) (Han)
- Huo Yu (霍禹; son of Huo Guang) (Han)
- Xiahou Xuan (Wei)
- Liu Shen (劉沈) (Jin)
- Liu Lancheng (劉蘭成) (Tang)
- Bianji (辯機) (Tang, legend)
- Wang Ya (Tang)
- Shu Yuanyu (Tang)
- Li Qi (Tang)
- Li Shihui (李師回) (Tang)
- Huang Dehe (黃德和) (Song)
- Gao Qi (Ming)
- Fang Xiaoru (Ming)
- Yu Hongtu (俞鴻圖) (Qing, legend)
  - According to a legend not attested in the official histories recounts that in 1734, Yu Hongtu (俞鴻圖), the Education Administrator of Henan, was sentenced to a waist chop. After being cut in two at the waist, he remained alive long enough to write the Chinese character cǎn (慘; "cruel, awful") seven times with his own blood before dying. After hearing this, the Yongzheng Emperor abolished this form of execution. However, according to other sources such as Draft History of Qing and Qing shi bian nian (清史编年) (China Renmin University Press), Yu was beheaded instead, not chopped at the waist.

== See also ==
- Hemicorporectomy, a surgical procedure
- Lingchi, another torturous form of execution used in China
