= Sweet Dew incident =

835 Tang dynasty political plot

- Native name: 甘露事變
- Date: 14 December 835; 1190 years ago
- Type: Coup d'état
- Cause: Imperial displeasure with eunuch power
- Target: Eunuchs
- Casualties: Li Xun, Zheng Zhu, and many of their associates and other officials

Sweet Dew incident
- Traditional Chinese: 甘露事變
- Simplified Chinese: 甘露事变
- Literal meaning: "Sweet Dew Incident"
Transcriptions
Standard Mandarin
- Hanyu Pinyin: Gānlù shìbiàn
- Wade–Giles: Kan^{1}-lu^{4} shih^{4}-pien^{4}
- IPA: [kánlû ʂɻ̩̂.pjɛ̂n]
Yue: Cantonese
- Yale Romanization: Gāmlouh sihbin
- Jyutping: Gam1-lou6 si6-bin3
- IPA: [kɐm˥lɔw˨ si˨pin˧]

The Sweet Dew incident or Ganlu incident (Chinese: 甘露事變) was a failed coup on 14 December 835 by Emperor Wenzong of the Chinese Tang dynasty to seize power from the eunuchs. The emperor planned to kill the eunuchs with the aid of the chancellor Li Xun and the general Zheng Zhu. The eunuchs learned of the plot and solidified their control with a counter-coup; Li, Zheng, many of their followers, and other officials were killed.

== Prelude ==
Emperor Wenzong was introduced to Li Xun (then named Li Zhongyan) and Zheng Zhu by the powerful eunuch Wang Shoucheng. Li and Zheng's association with Wang put the pair above the eunuchs' suspicion, which was advantageous when they joined the emperor against the eunuchs. By summer 835, Wenzong approved a plan by Li and Zheng to pacify the empire; the plan had three steps – destroy the eunuchs, recover territory lost to the Tibetan Empire, and destroy the warlords north of the Yellow River.

Wenzong began executing the plan in the summer of 835. Command of one of the Shence armies was transferred from eunuch Wei Yuansu (韋元素) to eunuch Qiu Shiliang, one of Wang's rivals; the other army was also eunuch controlled. Wei and the directors of palace communications, the eunuchs Yang Chenghe (楊承和) and Wang Jianyan (王踐言), were made monitors of different circuits and then ordered to commit suicide; Wang had been in conflict with the trio and may have been placated by their removal from the capital Chang'an. Zheng was made military governor of Fengxiang Circuit (鳳翔, headquartered in modern Baoji, Shaanxi) to raise imperial troops. Li and Zheng had eunuchs Tian Quancao (田全操), Liu Xingshen (劉行深), Zhou Yuanzhen (周元稹), Xue Shigan (薛士幹), Sixian Yiyi (似先義逸), and Liu Yingchan (劉英, final character not in Unicode) – all with previous conflicts with Wang – assigned to survey six remote circuits, intending to order their suicides with edicts drafted by imperial scholar Gu Shiyong (顧師邕).

In winter 835, Wenzong – on the advice of Li and Zheng – had Wang commit suicide. According to the plan, Wang's funeral in Chang'an on December 20 would be attended by all of the eunuchs; Zheng and his personal guards would also attend and use surprise to kill the eunuchs. By this time, Li was chancellor and jealously believed that Zheng would receive all the credit for the plot. Li decided to act first and made appointments to raise troops – Guo Xingyu (郭行餘) as the military governor of Binning Circuit (邠寧, headquartered in modern Xianyang, Shaanxi); Wang Fan (王璠) as the military governor of Hedong Circuit (河東, headquartered in modern Taiyuan, Shanxi); Luo Liyan (羅立言) as the acting mayor of Jingzhao; and Han Yue (韓約) as a general of the imperial guards. Other than the new appointments, it was said that only deputy chief imperial censor Li Xiaoben (李孝本) and fellow chancellor Shu Yuanyu were aware of Li's plans.

== Events ==
=== Initial launching stage by Li Xun and his allies ===
On 14 December, Wenzong hosted an imperial meeting with the officials at Zichen Hall (紫宸殿). Han Yue, who was the general of the Left Jinwu Corps (左金吾), instead of giving the customary report that everything was well that the Left Jinwu and Right Jinwu generals were to give, instead stated that the night previous, sweet dew (甘露 ganlu in Chinese) had descended on a pomegranate tree outside the Left Jinwu headquarters. He bowed to Wenzong, and the chancellors immediately led the other officials in congratulating the Emperor (as sweet dew was considered a sign of divine favor). Li Xun and Shu Yuanyu suggested that Wenzong observe the sweet dew himself so that he can receive blessings from heaven. Wenzong agreed, and the officials proceeded to Hanyuan Hall (含元殿), near the Left Jinwu headquarters. Wenzong himself took a litter to Hanyuan Hall.

Once the Emperor and the officials arrived at Hanyuan Hall, Wenzong ordered the chancellors, as well as officials of the examination bureau (門下省, Menxia Sheng) and legislative bureau (中書省, Zhongshu Sheng), to examine the sweet dew at the Left Jinwu headquarters. After they did so, Li Xun returned and announced, "After we took our examinations, it appeared to me that those were not real sweet dews. This should not be announced immediately; otherwise, the empire would prematurely congratulate you." Wenzong expressed surprise and ordered Qiu Shiliang and fellow Shence Army commander Yu Hongzhi (魚弘志) to lead the other eunuchs to examine the sweet dew.

After the eunuchs left Hanyuan Hall, Li Xun immediately summoned Guo Xingyu and Wang Fan to Hanyuan Hall and stated, "Be ready to receive the edict." Wang was fearful, and he did not proceed into Wenzong's presence, but Guo did and knelt before the Emperor. Meanwhile, it was said that Wang and Guo had several hundred soldiers with them; initially, the soldiers stood outside Danfeng Gate (丹鳳門), outside Hanyuan Hall. Li Xun had them summoned inside Danfeng Gate to receive the edict, but only Wang's soldiers went in, and Guo's soldiers did not.

Meanwhile, Qiu and the other eunuchs were at the Left Jinwu headquarters. Han, however, had become fearful and was nervous and sweating. Qiu began to sense that something was wrong. Suddenly, a gust of wind blew up a screen, and Qiu saw many armed soldiers and heard the sounds of clanging weapons. Qiu and the other eunuchs were surprised and quickly ran outside. The guards at the Left Jinwu headquarters were about to close the gate to keep them in, but Qiu yelled at them, and they, surprised, could not close the gates. Qiu and the other eunuchs ran back to Hanyuan Hall, preparing to report to Wenzong what was happening.

=== Battle at Hanyuan Hall ===
When Li Xun saw the eunuchs running back to Hanyuan Hall, he yelled at the Jinwu guards for them to protect the emperor and promised them rewards. The eunuchs, however, yelled that there was an emergency and that the emperor must return to the palace at once. They grabbed Emperor Wenzong's litter, put him on it, and ran north through the roped screen behind Hanyuan Hall (breaking the screen in the process) toward the palace. Li Xun ran after the litter and grabbed it, yelling, "I have not finished my report, and Your Imperial Majesty should not return to the palace!"

At this time, the Jinwu guards were in Hanyuan Hall, along with the Jingzhao Municipal government police under Luo Liyan and the office of imperial censors' guards under Li Xiaoben, attacking the eunuchs. More than 10 eunuchs were killed or injured, but this attack was unable to prevent the eunuchs from carrying Emperor Wenzong's litter through Xuanzheng Gate (宣政門), into the palace. Li Xun, who was still holding on to the litter, urged Emperor Wenzong to stop, but Emperor Wenzong yelled at him to stop yelling. The eunuch Chi Zhirong (郗志榮) battered Li Xun's chest, and Li Xun fell onto the ground. The litter then entered Xuanzheng Gate, and the gate was closed. The eunuchs were cheering. The officers lined up at Hanyuan Hall paused momentarily and then fled. Knowing that he had failed, Li Xun put on a green uniform belonging to his staff members, got onto a horse, and fled, stating loudly on the road, "What crime did I commit that I am exiled?" No one on the road suspected him of being Li Xun. Meanwhile, Shu Yuanyu, along with other chancellors Wang Ya and Jia Su, returned to the office of the chancellors and believed that soon Emperor Wenzong would summon them to deal with the aftermath. When the officials under them came to inquire what had occurred, they told those subordinates to keep working and not to worry.

=== Slaughter of the officials ===
Meanwhile, by this point, Qiu Shiliang and the other eunuchs had realized that Emperor Wenzong was complicit with this plot, and were openly cursing the emperor in his presence. It was said that Emperor Wenzong was so fearful that he could not speak. Meanwhile, Qiu and the other eunuchs sent the Shence Army officers Liu Tailun (劉泰倫) and Wei Zhongqing (魏仲卿), with 500 soldiers each, armed with swords, to attack those they considered to be associates of Li Xun and Zheng Zhu.

At that time, Wang Ya and the other chancellors were ready to have their regular lunch conference. A staff member informed them, "Soldiers are coming out of the palace and killing everyone they meet!" The chancellors, unable to get on horses quickly, fled on foot. The officials of the legislative and examination bureaus, and the Jinwu soldiers, numbering over 1,000 people, were also trying to flee, but they were bottlenecked at the gate to the office of the chancellors, and eventually, the gates were closed with some 600 of them still trapped inside, and the Shence Army soldiers slaughtered them. Qiu and the other eunuchs also sent Shence Army soldiers to close all gates to the imperial city and enter various governmental offices to attack the officials. It was said that the officials and their guards, and civilians who happened to be in the offices, were all slaughtered – over 1,000 people. Various files, seals, books, and other equipment owned by the government were destroyed in the process. The eunuchs also sent cavalry soldiers outside the imperial city to try to capture those who had fled.

Shu Yuanyu was captured after changing into civilian clothes and getting on a horse to flee from Anhua Gate (安化門). Wang Ya, who was in his 70s, walked to a tea shop in the Yongchang District (永昌里) and was captured there. The soldiers took Wang to the Left Shence Army headquarters, where he was tortured. Wang, unable to stand the pain, falsely confessed that he and Li Xun were planning to overthrow Emperor Wenzong and support Zheng as the new emperor. Wang Fan fled back to his mansion at Changxing District (長興里) and ordered the soldiers of Hedong Circuit to guard his mansion. When the Shence Army officers arrived, they yelled out to him, "Wang Ya committed treason. The Emperor wants you to take over as chancellor, and Commander Yu wanted me to come give my regards." Wang Fan, believing them, exited his mansion, and the officers began to give him mock congratulations. Only then did Wang Fan realize that he had been tricked. The Shence Army soldiers also captured Luo Liyan at Taiping District (太平里), and also captured Wang Ya's relatives and household servants, imprisoning all of them. Li Xun's cousin Li Yuangao (李元臯) was killed.

Meanwhile, the Shence Army soldiers were also pillaging wealthy households under the guise of searching for Li Xun's associates and the chancellors. For example, because Hu Zheng (胡證), the former military governor of Lingnan Circuit (嶺南, headquartered in modern Guangzhou, Guangdong), was extremely wealthy, the Shence Army soldiers used the excuse of searching for Jia Su to enter his mansion, and they killed his son Hu Yin (胡溵). Similarly pillaged were the households of the officials Luo Rang (羅讓), Hun Hui (渾鐬), and Li Zhi (黎埴). It was said that many street hoodlums also used this opportunity to take vengeance and to pillage.

=== Executions of Li Xun, his associates, and other chancellors ===
The morning of 15 December, when the surviving officials were to enter the palace for the routine imperial gathering at Zichen Hall, the Jianfu Gate (建福門) was not opened until the sun rose, and the Shence Army soldiers guarding the gates allowed each official to bring only one attendant with them. None of the chancellors or imperial censors attended the meeting, and many other positions at the imperial gathering were also missing. When Emperor Wenzong inquired why the chancellors were not there, Qiu Shiliang responded, "Wang Ya and the others committed treason, and they have been arrested." Qiu showed Wang Ya's confession to Emperor Wenzong, and further showed them to the Pushe (僕射, heads of the executive bureau (尚書省, Shangshu Sheng)) Linghu Chu and Zheng Tan. Emperor Wenzong became saddened and angered when he read Wang Ya's confession and asked Linghu and Zheng whether this was Wang Ya's handwriting. When Linghu and Zheng confirmed it was, Emperor Wenzong responded, "Then not even execution is enough for their crimes." He issued an order that Linghu and Zheng take over at the office of the chancellors and handle the matters there, and that Linghu draft an edict to explain what had occurred (i.e., to declare the guilt of Wang Ya and the other chancellors). However, although Linghu did so, Linghu wrote the edict in dull language when describing Wang Ya's and Jia Su's alleged treason, thus angering Qiu. As a result, while eventually, Zheng was made chancellor, Linghu was not.

Meanwhile, the pillaging on the streets was continuing. The eunuchs ordered the Shence Army officers Yang Zhen (楊鎮) and Jin Suiliang (靳遂良) to take 500 soldiers each and take over security over the key streets of Chang'an. The soldiers beat drums to warn the hoodlums, and after killing 10 hoodlums, the situation calmed down.

Jia had changed into civilian clothes and hidden among the people, but after one night, he came to believe that there would be no way that he would be able to flee. He changed into mourning clothes and rode a donkey to Xing'an Gate (興安門), informing the guards at Xing'an Gate that he was Jia, and asking to be delivered to the Shence Armies. The guards delivered him to the Right Shence Army. Meanwhile, Li Xiaoben changed into a green uniform (as Li Xu did), but continued to wear a gold belt. He covered his face with a hat and tried to ride a horse to flee to Fengxiang. When he was just west of Xianyang (咸陽, in modern Xianyang), he was captured by the Shence Army soldiers.

On 16 December, Zheng Tan was named chancellor.

Meanwhile, Li Xun had fled to the Zhongnan Mountain (終南山) to try to seek refuge with the Buddhist monk Zongmi, with whom he was friendly. Zongmi wanted to give Li Xun a tonsure and disguise him as a monk, but Zongmi's followers urged him not to accept Li Xun. Li Xun thus exited Zhongnan Mountain and tried to flee to Fengxiang. He was, however, intercepted on the way by the defender of Zhouzhi (盩厔, in modern Xi'an), Song Chu (宋楚), who arrested him and had him delivered to Chang'an. When Li Xun's escort reached Kunming Pond (昆明池), Li Xun, fearful that the eunuchs would torture and humiliate him, told the officer escorting him to decapitate him so that the Shence Army soldiers could not seize him and take the glory themselves. The officer agreed and decapitated Li Xun, delivering the head to Chang'an.

On 17 December, Li Shi, who Luo Liyan had displaced as mayor of Jingzhao, was named chancellor and director of finances.

On the same day, a grand procession was held for the executions of the chancellors and the key associates of Li Xun. 300 soldiers from the Left Shence Army, holding Li Xun's head high in front of the procession, escorted Wang Ya, Wang Fan, Luo, and Guo Xingyu. 300 soldiers from the Right Shence Army escorted Jia, Shu Yuanyu, and Li Xiaoben. The officials were taken to the imperial ancestral shrines and the shrines to the gods of earth, and they were presented as if they were sacrificial animals. They were then paraded at the eastern and western markets of Chang'an. With the imperial officials ordered to oversee the executions, they were executed by being cut in half at the waist, and then their heads were cut off and hung outside Xing'an Gate. Their relatives, no matter how distantly related, were executed, including children, and some who had somehow initially escaped death were made into government slaves. It was said that during these few days, none of the decisions being made in Emperor Wenzong's name were actually made by Emperor Wenzong himself (or even known by him); rather, Qiu and Yu Hongzhi were making all of these decisions.

On 18 December, Gu Shiyong was arrested, even though the edicts that he had drafted ordering that the six eunuchs sent out to survey the circuits be forced to commit suicide were ignored by the six circuits receiving the edicts.

Meanwhile, Zheng Zhu, unaware of Li Xun's actions and still acting on the original plan, had taken his guards and departed Fengxiang. When he got to Fufeng (扶風, in modern Baoji), the magistrate of Fufeng County, Han Liao (韓遼), became aware of Zheng's plan and therefore refused to supply him and fled to Wugong (武功, in modern Xianyang). When Zheng received news that Li Xun had failed, he returned to Fengxiang. His subordinate Wei Hongjie (魏弘節) suggested to him that he kill the eunuch monitor of Fengxiang, Zhang Zhongqing (張仲卿), and several officers, but Zheng, terrified, did not know what to do. At the same time, Qiu delivered an edict in Emperor Wenzong's name to Zhang, ordering Zhang to act against Zheng. Zhang was initially not sure how to act, but under the suggestion from the officer Li Shuhe (李叔和), Zhang invited Zheng to a feast. Li Shuhe gave Zheng's guards food and drink, and then, at the feast, while Zheng was not paying attention, he killed and decapitated him. He then had Zheng's guards, Zheng's household, and a large number of Zheng's staff members slaughtered. Zhang had Li Shuhe deliver Zheng's head to Chang'an, and Li Shuhe arrived there on 20 December – where, on 19 December, the eunuchs had readied the troops in case of an attack by Zheng, causing much panic in the people of Chang'an. Only after Zheng's head was hung on Xing'an Gate was it said that the people were calmed somewhat. Also on 20 December, Han Yue was captured, and on December 21, Han was executed.

== Aftermath ==
After the incident, the eunuchs, led by Qiu Shiliang and Yu Hongzhi, controlled the political scene completely for some time. When the six eunuchs who were almost forced to commit suicide returned to Chang'an, Tian Yuancao claimed that he was ready to slaughter the officials, and this led to another major panic at Chang'an. The people calmed only after Li Shi and General Chen Junshang (陳君賞) remained calm.

In spring 836, the military governor of Zhaoyi Circuit (昭義, headquartered in modern Changzhi, Shanxi), Liu Congjian, submitted a harshly worded accusation against the eunuchs, claiming that the chancellors were innocent and that the eunuchs were guilty of grievous crimes. The eunuchs initially tried to placate Liu by bestowing high honors on him, but he continued to submit accusations against them, particularly against Qiu. It was said that only after Liu's accusations did the eunuchs become somewhat apprehensive and allow Emperor Wenzong, Li Shi, and Zheng Tan some ability to govern. Still, it was said that after the Sweet Dew Incident, for almost the rest of the Tang dynasty's history, the eunuchs were in firm control of the government, determining the successions of emperors.
