= Li Cheng (Tang dynasty) =

Li Cheng (李程) (c. 766? - 842?), courtesy name Biaochen (表臣), formally Duke Miu of Pengyuan (彭原繆公), was an official of the Chinese Tang dynasty, serving as a chancellor during the reign of Emperor Jingzong.

== Background ==
Li Cheng was probably born in about 766. He was a fifth-generation descendant of Li Shenfu (李神符) the Prince of Xiangyi, who was a cousin of the Tang dynasty's founding emperor Emperor Gaozu. His grandfather Li Bo (李柏) served as the minister of husbandry, and his father Li Su (李鷫) served as a prefectural prefect.

In 796, Li Cheng passed the imperial examinations as a Jinshi, and further passed a special examination in grand speech. Thereafter, he served on the staff of several military governors (Jiedushi). In 804, he returned to the capital Chang'an to serve as an imperial chancellor with the title Jiancha Yushi (監察御史), and later that year became an imperial scholar (翰林學士, Hanlin Xueshi). After then-reigning Emperor Dezong died in 805 and was succeeded by his son Emperor Shunzong, Li was pushed out of the office of the imperial scholars by fellow imperial scholar Wang Shuwen, a trusted advisor to Emperor Shunzong, and he thereafter served three terms as low-level officials in various ministries.

== During the reigns of Emperors Xianzong and Muzong ==
During the middle of the Yuanhe era (806–820) of Emperor Shunzong's son Emperor Xianzong, Li Cheng was sent out to Xichuan Circuit (西川, headquartered in modern Chengdu, Sichuan) to serve as the military commander of the circuit. In 815, he was recalled to Chang'an to serve as the deputy minister of defense (兵部侍郎, Bingbu Shilang) and also became in charge of drafting imperial edicts. When the general Han Hong was made the overall commander of Emperor Xianzong's campaign against the warlord Wu Yuanji that year, Li was sent to the battlefront to declare Han's commission. In 816, he was made Zhongshu Sheren (中書舍人), a mid-level official at the legislative bureau of government (中書省, Zhongshu Sheng), as well as acting mayor of the capital municipality Jingzhao (京兆). In 817, he was responsible for the imperial examinations that year. In 818, he was made the deputy minister of rites (禮部侍郎, Lǐbu Shilang), but was soon made the governor (觀察使, Guanchashi) of Eyue Circuit (鄂岳, headquartered in modern Wuhan, Hubei), as well as the prefect of Eyue's capital E Prefecture (鄂州). At a later point, he was recalled to serve as the deputy minister of civil service affairs (吏部侍郎, Lìbu Shilang, note different tone), and created the Baron of Weiyuan.

== During the reign of Emperor Jingzong ==
In 824, shortly after the death of Emperor Xianzong's son and successor Emperor Muzong and succession by Emperor Muzong's son Emperor Jingzong, Li Cheng, who was then still the deputy minister of civil service affairs, was given the additional designation Tong Zhongshu Menxia Pingzhangshi (同中書門下平章事), making him a chancellor de facto. (It was said that Li Cheng was named because Emperor Jingzong inquired of another chancellor, Li Fengji, of who might be appropriate chancellors; Li Fengji listed a number of officials, and of Li Fengji's list, Li Cheng was listed first, and so was made chancellor.) At that time, Emperor Jingzong, who was young, wanted to build and rebuild many palaces. Li Cheng pointed out that Emperor Jingzong was still new to the throne and still in the mourning period for Emperor Muzong, and that it was inappropriate for him to undertake these construction projects. Under his suggestion, the raw material that Emperor Jingzong had gathered were diverted to repair the various imperial tombs. Li Cheng also suggested, along with Wei Chuhou, that the senior official Pei Du, who had been ejected out of the capital due to discord with Li Fengji, be honored, and under Wei's and Li Cheng's suggestion, Emperor Jingzong gave Pei an honorary chancellor title. Li Cheng also suggested that imperial scholars be appointed to attend to Emperor Jingzong in his studies. It was said that Li Cheng was eloquent and calculating, and he was able to change Emperor Jingzong's mind. He was soon made Zhongshu Shilang (中書侍郎), the deputy head of the legislative bureau, and created the greater title of Duke of Pengyuan, while continuing to serve as chancellor.

In 825, there was an incident in which one Wu Zhao (武昭) was accused of threatening to kill Li Fengji. Previously, after Wu had served as a prefectural prefect, he sought a better appointment, but was given the largely powerless position of serving as secretary general to Emperor Jingzong's granduncle Li Shen (李紳) the Prince of Yuan. Li Cheng, who was friendly with Wu, wanted to give Wu a more useful position, but Li Fengji, who by that point was no longer friendly to Li Cheng, opposed, and Li Cheng's relative Li Rengshu (李仍叔) informed Wu of this. Once, when Wu became drunk, he made the remark to his friend Mao Hui (茅彙) that he was going to kill Li Fengji. When this was reported, Wu was arrested. Li Fengji's follower Li Zhongyan suggested to Mao that, if Mao was willing to implicate Li Cheng, he would be rewarded. Mao refused. As a result of the subsequent investigations, Wu was executed by caning; Li Rengshu was demoted; and Li Zhongyan and Mao were exiled.

In 826, Li Cheng was relieved of his post as chancellor (although he continued to hold the Tong Zhongshu Menxia Pingzhangshi designation as an honorary title), and made the military governor of Hedong Circuit (河東, headquartered in modern Taiyuan, Shanxi), as well as the mayor of its capital Taiyuan Municipality.

== During the reign of Emperor Wenzong ==
In 830, by which time Emperor Jingzong's brother Emperor Wenzong was emperor, Li Cheng was made the military governor of Hezhong Circuit (河中, headquartered in modern Yuncheng, Shanxi) as well as mayor of its capital Hezhong Municipality, and he continued to carry the honorary Tong Zhongshu Menxia Pingzhangshi title. In 832, he was given the honorary title of acting Sikong (司空, one of the Three Excellencies). Soon thereafter, he was recalled to Chang'an to serve as Zuo Puye (左僕射), one of the heads of the executive bureau (尚書省, Shangshu Sheng). Emperor Wenzong had, recently prior to the commission, issued an edict that when the Puye took office, all of the imperial officials were to formally congratulate him, and the officials of the fourth rank or below (in Tang's system of nine ranks for officials) were all to bow to him, and Wang Ya and Dou Yizhi, who had recently received Puye commissions, accepted the grand ceremonial bows. Li did not find this appropriate, and requested reconsideration. The executive bureau's secretary general Li Han (李漢) also found the ceremonies to be too serious, but Emperor Wenzong nevertheless ordered the ceremonial bows be carried out. Meanwhile, it was said that Li Cheng was talented and learned, but was seen as frivolous, careless, and overly humorous, and therefore did not have a good reputation despite his high position.

In 833, Li Cheng was again sent out of the capital to serve as the military governor of Xuanwu Circuit (宣武, headquartered in modern Kaifeng, Henan), as well as the prefect of its capital Bian Prefecture (汴州); he also continued to carry the honorary title of acting Sikong. In 835, he was again the military governor of Hezhong and the mayor of Hezhong, and was given the honorary title of acting Situ (司徒, also one of the Three Excellencies). In 836, he was recalled to Chang'an to serve as You Puye (右僕射), the other head of the executive bureau, as well as acting minister of worship (太常卿, Taichang Qing). He soon thereafter also assumed the post of acting minister of civil service affairs (吏部尚書, Libu Shangshu) and was in charge of selecting officials. In 837, he was sent out to serve as the military governor of Shannan East Circuit (山南東道, headquartered in modern Xiangfan, Hubei) and the prefect of its capital Xiang Prefecture (襄州), carrying the acting Situ title. In 841 he served as defender of Luoyang. While he presumably died in office at the age of 76 before 842 when Niu Sengru was appointed as the new defender of Luoyang, it was not explicitly indicated when he died. He was posthumously honored as Taibao and given a posthumous name Miu (缪).

== Notes and references ==
- Old Book of Tang, vol. 167.
- New Book of Tang, vol. 131.
- Zizhi Tongjian, vols. 243, 244.
