= Wang Ya =

Wang Ya (Chinese: 王涯; died December 17, 835), courtesy name Guangjin (廣津), noble title Duke of Dai (代國公), was an official of the Chinese Tang dynasty, serving as a chancellor during the reigns of Emperor Xianzong and Emperor Xianzong's grandson Emperor Wenzong. During Emperor Wenzong's reign, he became involved in a major power struggle between imperial officials and eunuchs known as the Sweet Dew incident, and he was killed via waist chop by the eunuchs along with three other chancellors, Li Xun, Jia Su, and Shu Yuanyu.

== Background ==
It is not known what year Wang Ya was born in—although he should have been born sometime between 757 and 765, as he was said to be in his 70s when he eventually died in 835. His family was from the Tang dynasty's northern capital Taiyuan and claimed to be descended from the Northern Wei official Wang Jiong (王冏). His grandfather Wang Zuo (王祚) served as a military advisor to a prefect, while his father Wang Huang (王晃) served as a prefectural prefect. He had at least two older brothers, Wang Zhao (王沼) and Wang Jie (王潔).

In 792, during the reign of Emperor Dezong, Wang Ya passed the imperial examinations in the class of those who used grand speech, and he was made the sheriff of Lantian County (藍田, in modern Xi'an, Shaanxi). In 804, he was made Hanlin Xueshi (翰林學士), an imperial scholar. He thereafter served in the palace, going through the offices of You Shiyi (右拾遺), a low-level consultant at the legislative bureau of government (中書省, Zhongshu Sheng); Zuo Bujue (左補闕), a consultant at the examination bureau (門下省, Menxia Sheng); and Qiju Sheren (起居舍人), an imperial chronicler. After Emperor Dezong died in 805 and was succeeded by his seriously ill son Emperor Shunzong, Wang was one of the imperial scholars who were involved in drafting the edict to create Emperor Shunzong's son Li Chun crown prince, along with Zheng Yin, Wei Cigong (衛次公), and Li Cheng.

== During Emperor Xianzong's reign ==
In summer 808, by which time Li Chun was emperor (as Emperor Xianzong), a special imperial examination was held for examinees to submit criticism of the government. Niu Sengru, Huangfu Shi (皇甫湜), and Li Zongmin were considered to have written criticisms that were particularly on point and were ranked the highest by the officials in charge of grading, Yang Yuling (楊於陵) and Wei Guanzhi. Initially, Emperor Xianzong was set to give commissions to Niu, Huangfu, and Li Zongmin, but the chancellor Li Jifu was offended by the criticism. As Wang Ya and fellow imperial scholar Pei Ji were the reviewers of the examination, and Huangfu was Wang's nephew, he accused Pei and Wang of conflict of interest. Due to Li Jifu's accusations, Pei and Wang were stripped of their imperial scholar status and both demoted—with Wang being made Duguan Yuanwailang (都官員外郎), a low-level official at the ministry of justice (刑部, Xingbu), and subsequently being sent out of the capital to serve as the military advisor to the prefect of Guo Prefecture (虢州, in modern Sanmenxia, Henan). Yang and Wei were also demoted out of the capital Chang'an. He was subsequently further made the prefect of Yuan Prefecture (袁州, in modern Yichun, Jiangxi).

However, it was said that Emperor Xianzong missed Wang, and Wang was eventually recalled to serve as Bingbu Yuanwailang (兵部員外郎), a low-level official at the ministry of defense (兵部, Bingbu), and put in charge of drafting edicts. He was then again made imperial scholar as well as deputy minister of public works (工部侍郎, Gongbu Shilang). He was also created the Baron of Qingyuan. It was said that Wang was a talented writer and many of the edicts that had beautiful language during the reigns of Emperors Dezong and Xianzong were drafted by Wang. As Wang did not engage in partisanship, Emperor Xianzong often consulted with him.

In 816, Wang was made Zhongshu Shilang (中書侍郎), the deputy head of the legislative bureau, as well as chancellor de facto with the title Tong Zhongshu Menxia Pingzhangshi (同中書門下平章事). In 817, there was an occasion when Emperor Xianzong wanted to make one of his close associates, Zhang Su (張宿), a high-level consultant, drawing a strenuous objection from the chancellor Li Fengji—and this was partially responsible for Emperor Xianzong's removing Li Fengji and making him a military governor (jiedushi). Wang and fellow chancellor Cui Qun also objected to Zhang's commission, but eventually allowed Zhang to serve as acting consultant.

In 818, Wang was removed from his chancellor position and made the deputy minister of defense (兵部侍郎, Bingbu Shilang), as Emperor Xianzong considered him too silent and unsuitable to be chancellor. He was subsequently made the deputy minister of civil service affairs (吏部侍郎, Libu Shilang).

== During Emperor Muzong's reign ==
In 820, after Emperor Xianzong died and was succeeded by his son Emperor Muzong, Wang Ya was made the military governor of Dongchuan Circuit (東川, headquartered in modern Mianyang, Sichuan) and the prefect of Dongchuan's capital Zi Prefecture (梓州). In winter 820, after Tufan forces made a two-pronged incursion later in the year and attacked Ya Prefecture (雅州, in modern Ya'an, Sichuan), Wang submitted a petition suggesting that a request be made to the "northern barbarians"—probably referring to the generally friendly Uyghur Khaganate—requesting that they attack the "western barbarians" (i.e. Tufan) and offering great rewards if they did so. Emperor Muzong did not respond to Wang's suggestion.

In 821, when Chengde (成德, headquartered in modern Shijiazhuang, Hebei) and Lulong (盧龍, headquartered in modern Beijing) Circuits, which had briefly submitted to imperial control, rebelled under the leadership of Wang Tingcou and Zhu Kerong respectively, Wang Ya submitted a petition suggesting that Zhu be tolerated and pardoned so that he would not join Wang Tingcou in fighting the imperial forces and that the efforts be concentrated against Wang Tingcou. By the time that Wang Ya's petition arrived at Chang'an, however, Yingmo Circuit (瀛莫, headquartered in modern Cangzhou, Hebei), which had been carved out of Pinglu Circuit previously, had already mutinied and rejoined Lulong, with the soldiers arresting its imperially commissioned governor Lu Shimei (盧士玫) and delivering him to Zhu. Wang Ya's suggestion thus could not be carried out.

In 823, Wang Ya was recalled to Chang'an to serve as chief imperial censor (御史大夫, Yushi Daifu).

== During Emperor Jingzong's reign ==
After Emperor Muzong died in 824 and was succeeded by his son Emperor Jingzong, Wang Ya was made the deputy minister of census (戶部侍郎, Hubu Shilang) but also continued to serve as chief imperial censor, as well as the director of the salt and iron monopolies and grain supply for the Chang'an region. He was soon made the minister of rites (禮部尚書, Libu Shangshu) and continued to serve as the director of the monopolies and supply. In 826, he was made the military governor of Shannan West Circuit (山南西道, headquartered in modern Hanzhong, Shaanxi), as well as its capital Xingyuan Municipality (興元).

== During Emperor Wenzong's reign ==
In 829, by which time Emperor Jingzong's brother Emperor Wenzong was emperor, Wang Ya was recalled to serve as the minister of worship (太常卿, Taichang Qing). As Emperor Wenzong opined that the music used at imperial ceremonies at the time were too frivolous and wanted more ancient-style music, he had Wang Ya consult the older musicians and took music from Emperor Xuanzong's Kaiyuan era (713–741). The young musicians were taught the music, which became known as "Yunshao Style" (雲韶樂). Once the musical reorganization was done, Wang, along with the secretary general of the worship ministry Li Kuo (李廓) and the director of palace supplies Yu Chengxian (庾承憲) presented the musicians to Emperor Wenzong. Emperor Wenzong was pleased and awarded Wang and the others colored silk.

In 830, Wang was made the minister of civil service affairs (吏部尚書, Libu Shangshu) and acting Sikong (司空, one of the Three Excellencies), as well as the director of the salt and iron monopolies and grain supplies again. Later that year, he was made Zuo Pushe (左僕射), one of the heads of the executive bureau (尚書省, Shangshu Sheng), and continued to be director of the monopolies and supplies. He reported to Emperor Wenzong that the 12 prefectures that Emperor Xianzong recaptured from the warlord Li Shidao in 819 had previously had copper and iron mines that were highly lucrative. At Wang's suggestion, Emperor Wenzong ordered that a new tax be levied from the mines.

In 833, Wang was again made chancellor with the title Tong Zhongshu Menxia Pingzhangshi, and continued to serve as the director of the monopolies and supplies. He was also created the Duke of Dai. As he had been recommended to serve as chancellor due to the efforts of Zheng Zhu, a close associate of the powerful eunuch Wang Shoucheng, when the imperial censor Li Kuan (李款) submitted an accusation against Zheng in late 833, he had the accusation suppressed. In spring 834, he was given the additional titles of acting Sikong, Menxia Shilang (門下侍郎, the deputy head of the examination bureau), imperial scholar at Hongwen Pavilion (弘文館), and the director of Taiqing Palace (太清宮). When Emperor Wenzong wanted to make one of the close associates of Zheng and Wang Shoucheng, Li Zhongyan, an imperial official, Wang Ya agreed despite the stern opposition of fellow chancellor Li Deyu. Li Deyu was subsequently demoted out of the capital to serve as a prefectural secretary general. In 835, due to Zheng's suggestion, Wang, despite his knowing that doing so was ill-advised, proposed an increase to the tea tax, which caused the people much distress.

Meanwhile, without Wang's knowledge, Li Zhongyan (whose name had been changed to Li Xun by this point), Zheng, and Emperor Wenzong had been plotting to massacre the eunuchs in the palace, as Emperor Wenzong had feared the lead eunuchs' power. On December 14, 835—in an incident later known as the Ganlu Incident—Li Xun had planned to have soldiers under his associates Guo Xingyu (郭行餘), Wang Fan (王璠), Luo Liyan (羅立言), Han Yue (韓約), and Li Xiaoben (李孝本) trap the eunuchs and massacre them. However, the powerful eunuch Qiu Shiliang discovered the plot and took control of Emperor Wenzong, and the eunuchs then had the Shence Army (神策軍) kill or arrest Li Xun's and Zheng's associates. Meanwhile, Wang Ya and the other chancellors were set to have lunch together at the office of the chancellors, when they received report that the Shence Army soldiers were killing everyone in their paths. The chancellors and the other officials fled on foot. Wang Ya was soon captured and taken to the Left Shence Army headquarters. He was tortured, and, unable to bear the pain, falsely stated that he and Li Xun had planned a coup to overthrow Emperor Wenzong and make Zheng emperor.

On December 17, the head of Li Xun (who had already been killed by this point), Wang Ya, Wang Fan, Luo, Guo, Li Xiaoben, and Wang Ya's fellow chancellors Jia Su and Shu Yuanyu, were paraded by the Shence Army soldiers to the imperial temples and altar, and then they were taken under a tree and executed by being cut in half at the waist. Their families were also massacred. It was said that because the people particularly resented Wang Ya for raising tea taxes, they cursed and threw rocks or brick fragments at him as he was paraded. Their bodies were exposed to the elements. In spring 836, the senior official Linghu Chu requested that their bodies be buried, and Emperor Wenzong ordered such burial. However, Qiu had the tombs then opened up and threw their bodies into the Wei River. The Shence Army soldiers pillaged these executed officials' mansions for wealth, and it was said that, because Wang was so wealthy such that even though the soldiers and other looters looted his mansion for days, there were still valuables left. In particular, it was said that Wang held a large collection of valuable calligraphic works and paintings—which he had amassed by purchases and by giving their prior owners offices—and that while the looters took the jewels studded on the rolls or jade used for the rolls, they left the artwork.

With regard to Wang's and Jia's death, the Song dynasty historian Sima Guang, the author of the Zizhi Tongjian, commented:

The commentators all state that Wang Ya and Jia Su were both talented in literary abilities and had good reputations, and that they did not know about the conspiracy of Li Xun and Zheng Zhu but were nevertheless massacred with their families. The commentators thus felt angry and sad for them and sighed about their undue death. I do not agree. If the state were falling and one cannot help right it, what use is a chancellor? Wang and Jia calmly held high positions and enjoyed the wealth and honors, at the same time that the wicked men led by Li and Zheng used their trickery and fraud to reach the positions of chancellorship. Wang and Jia sat with them and did not feel shame in doing so. The state faced disaster and disturbance and they did not worry. They lived their lives day by day. They thought that they had the wonderful strategy to protect themselves and that no one was more intelligent than they were. If everyone could do this and suffer no disaster, what wicked person would not do so? Instead, within an instant disaster fell, the feet of the ding broke, the food spilled, and punishments were carried out in dark rooms. It is that Heaven destroyed them, not Qiu Shiliang.

Wang Ya's grandnephew Wang Yu (王羽) fled to Liu Congjian the reigning Military Governor of Zhaoyi. When Liu's nephew and successor Liu Zhen fell, Wang Yu was also killed.

== Posthumous rehabilitation ==
In 854, then-ruling Emperor Xuānzong (Emperor Muzong's brother) had Wang Ya and the other officials who died in the Ganlu Incident, except for Li Xun and Zheng Zhu, posthumously rehabilitated. Later, during the reign of Emperor Xuānzong's grandson Emperor Zhaozong, Wang's titles were further restored.

== Issue ==
- Wang Mengjian (王孟堅)
- Wang Zhongxiang (王仲翔)

== Notes and references ==
- Old Book of Tang, vol. 169.
- New Book of Tang, vol. 179.
- Zizhi Tongjian, vols. 236, 237, 239, 240, 244, 245.
