= Li Zhongyan =

Li Zhongyan (李仲言) (died December 16, 835), known as Li Xun (李訓) in 835, courtesy name initially Zixun (子訓), later Zichui (子垂), pseudonym Hermit Wang (王山人) during the mourning period for his mother, was an official of the Chinese Tang dynasty. He became a trusted advisor to Emperor Wenzong and plotted with Emperor Wenzong to end the hold the powerful eunuchs had on power by slaughtering the eunuchs, but when the effort failed (in an event later known as the Ganlu Incident), Li Xun and his associates were slaughtered.

== Background ==
It is not known when Li Zhongyan was born. According to his biographies in the official histories of Tang dynasty, the Old Book of Tang and the New Book of Tang, he was from the same branch of the Li family—the "Guzang Branch" (姑臧房)—as the chancellors Li Kui and Li Fengji, and was two generations below Li Kui and one generation below Li Fengji, although the family tree for the Greater Guzang Branch in the New Book of Tang did not mention Li Zhongyan or any of his male-line ancestors. It was said that Li Zhongyan was tall, handsome, charismatic, well-spoken, dexterous, and good at reading people's emotions. He passed the imperial examinations in the Jinshi (進士) class; thereafter, he served as an assistant teacher at the imperial university, before serving at as a staff member to the military governor (jiedushi) of Heyang Circuit (河陽, headquartered in modern Jiaozuo, Henan).

== Early involvement in politics ==
During Emperor Jingzong's reign (824–827), Li Fengji served as chancellor. Li Zhongyan became a close associate of Li Fengji's, and it was said that shortly after Emperor Jingzong took the throne, Li Zhongyan, along with Li Fengji's other associates Li Yu (李虞) and Zhang Youxin (張又新), participated in manufacturing false evidence against a political enemy of Li Fengji's, the imperial scholar Li Shen. As a result of Li Fengji's accusations against Li Shen—that when Emperor Jingzong's father Emperor Muzong died, Li Shen was intending to support Emperor Muzong's brother Li Cong (李悰) the Prince of Shen—Li Shen was exiled. Subsequently, Li Zhongyan, Zhang, Li Xuzhi (李續之), Li Yu, Liu Qichu (劉栖楚), Jiang Qia (姜洽), Zhang Quanyu (張權輿), and Cheng Xifan (程昔范), became known as Li Fengji's "Eight Gates"—i.e., people who wanted to see Li Fengji had to go through them.

In 825, the official Wu Zhao (武昭), displeased that he was not given a position with authority and believing that Li Fengji was the one who prevented his commission, stated to his friend Mao Hui (茅彙), when he was drunk, that he wanted to kill Li Fengji. This declaration was reported to the authorities, and Wu and Mao were arrested. During the investigations, Li Zhongyan tried to induce Mao to implicate the chancellor Li Cheng, who was not on good terms with Li Fengji. Mao refused to implicate Li Cheng, and reported Li Zhongyan's inducement to the investigating officials. As a result of the investigations, Wu was executed by caning, while Mao, Li Zhongyan, and Li Cheng's relative Li Rengshu (李仍叔) (who had told Wu that Li Fengji was refusing to give him a commission), were executed—in Li Zhongyan's case, to Xiang Prefecture (象州, in modern Laibin, Guangxi).

After Emperor Jingzong died around the new year 827 and was succeeded by his brother Emperor Wenzong, a general pardon was declared, and Li Zhongyan was allowed to return from exile. Later, when his mother died, he stayed at the eastern capital Luoyang to observe a mourning period.

== Association with Emperor Wenzong ==
At some point, Li Fengji, who wanted to be chancellor again, consulted Li Zhongyan. Li Zhongyan claimed to be friendly to the powerful eunuch Wang Shoucheng's close associate Zheng Zhu, and so Li Fengji gave Li Zhongyan a large amount of money to bribe Zheng. Zheng thereafter introduced Li Zhongyan to Wang, who in turn introduced Li Zhongyan to Emperor Wenzong and informed Emperor Wenzong that Li Zhongyan knew the I Ching well. As Li Zhongyan was then still supposed to be observing the mourning period for his mother, he could not enter the palace in mourning clothes, so he took on a Taoist monk's robe and took the name of Hermit Wang. It was said that Emperor Wenzong was impressed by Li Zhongyan's appearance, charisma, and ability to speak, and he treated Li Zhongyan well.

By fall 834, Li Zhongyan's mourning period was over. Emperor Wenzong wanted to make him an imperial scholar, but this was vehemently opposed by the chancellor Li Deyu, who pointed to Li Zhongyan's past, causing Emperor Wenzong to be displeased. 1Li Deyu's fellow chancellor Wang Ya, who initially agreed with Li Deyu, seeing Emperor Wenzong's displeasure, changed his mind and no longer opposed Li Zhongyan's commission—and, indeed, when Emperor Wenzong subsequently changed Li Zhongyan's commission to be one for an assistant teacher at the imperial university (a lower post, probably to placate Li Deyu) and advisory officials Zheng Su (鄭肅) and Han Ci (韓佽) sealed the edict and were set to return the edict to him for reconsideration, as was their prerogative, Wang persuaded them not to do so. Subsequently, because Wang, Li Zhongyan, and Zheng Zhu all resented Li Deyu, they had Li Deyu's political enemy, the former chancellor Li Zongmin, recalled from his post as military governor of Shannan West Circuit (山南西道, headquartered in modern Hanzhong, Shaanxi), to the capital Chang'an to again serve as chancellor. Soon thereafter, Li Deyu was removed from his chancellor position and sent out to be the military governor of Shannan West. On the same day, Li Zhongyan was made an assistant imperial scholar, over the objections of a number of advisory officials, including Zheng Su and Han.

In winter 834, Li Zhongyan changed his name to Li Xun.

Meanwhile, while Emperor Wenzong appeared to be outwardly respectful to Wang and other eunuchs who helped him take the throne, he was in fact resentful of their hold on power. Zheng and Li Xun figured out what the emperor was thinking, and thereafter began to plot with Emperor Wenzong on eliminating the powerful eunuchs—and Emperor Wenzong associated with them because he felt that they, as officials recommended by Wang, would not draw suspicions from the eunuchs. It was under their suggestion that, in spring 835, Emperor Wenzong partially diverted Wang's power by giving the command of one of the eunuch controlled Shence Armies to Wang's rival Qiu Shiliang.

There was, at the time, a rumor spread in Chang'an that Zheng Zhu was making immortality pills for Emperor Wenzong, and that the pills required infant hearts and livers as ingredients, causing much panic among the people. Zheng accused family members of the mayor of Jingzhao Municipality (京兆, i.e., the Chang'an region) Yang Yuqing (楊虞卿) of spreading the rumors, and Emperor Wenzong, incensed, arrested Yang. When Li Zongmin, who had previously refused to give Zheng an office he wanted, tried to intercede on Yang's behalf, Emperor Wenzong ordered Li Zongmin to leave his presence, and soon had him exiled.

It was said that Li Xun and Zheng drafted a master plan for reforming the state that had details and which impressed Emperor Wenzong, which called first for eliminating the eunuchs, then for recovery of the territory lost to Tufan, and then for destruction of the warlords north of the Yellow River. It was said that they became so powerful that they were carrying out reprisals against anyone they disliked—and that those persons were accused to be partisans of Li Deyu or Li Zongmin, and as Emperor Wenzong disfavored Li Deyu's and Li Zongmin's factionalism, those accused of being associates were easily chased out of government.

In summer 835, Li Xun took on the additional post as Bingbu Langzhong (兵部郎中), a supervisory official at the ministry of defense (兵部, Bingbu) and also became responsible for drafting imperial edicts, while also remaining as assistant imperial scholar.

It had long been rumored that the death of Emperor Wenzong's grandfather Emperor Xianzong was at the hands of the eunuch Chen Hongzhi (陳弘志), who was, by this point, serving as the eunuch monitor of Shannan East Circuit (山南東道, headquartered in modern Xiangfan, Hubei). Under Li Xun's advice, Emperor Wenzong recalled Chen from Shannan East, and when Chen reached Qingni Station (青泥驛, in modern Xi'an, Shaanxi), Emperor Wenzong had a cane sent to Qingni and ordered that Chen be caned to death.

Thereafter, under the plan by Li Xun and Zheng, Emperor Wenzong was set to commission Zheng as the military governor of Fengxiang Circuit (鳳翔, headquartered in modern Baoji, Shaanxi), so that he could gather forces to use in a plot against the eunuchs. The chancellor Li Guyan opposed, and Emperor Wenzong reacted by simultaneously commissioning Li Guyan as the military governor of Shannan West and Zheng as the military governor of Fengxiang. Li Xun, however, was himself jealous of Zheng at this point, and so actually secretly planned to eliminate Zheng after the plot against the eunuchs would succeed. As a result, when selecting a staff for Zheng, he selected officials who were considered mild in their disposition, rather than those considered to be able. Shortly after Zheng's commission, Li Xun and Shu Yuanyu (who investigated Yang Yuqing) were named chancellors with the designation Tong Zhongshu Menxia Pingzhangshi (同中書門下平章事). Meanwhile, at Li Xun's and Zheng's advice, Emperor Wenzong gave Wang Shoucheng the honorific title of monitor of the Shence Armies and stripped him of military command.

== Ganlu Incident and death ==
In winter 835, at Li Xun's and Zheng Zhu's advice, Emperor Wenzong sent poisoned wine to Wang Shoucheng to poison him to death.

Wang Shoucheng's death was a part of further planning by Emperor Wenzong, Li Xun, and Zheng—the plan was that when Wang was set to be buried on December 20, 835, Zheng, who claimed that he was grateful to Wang, would take his personal guards, who were armed with sharp axes, with him to attend the funeral. At the funeral, the guards would then surround the eunuchs and slaughter them. However, Li Xun discussed the plan with his associates, and he concluded that if that were to happen, Zheng would receive all of the credit, and therefore he resolved to act before Zheng would, planning to kill Zheng as well after he succeeded. To that end, Li Xun had Guo Xingyu (郭行餘) made the military governor of Binning Circuit (邠寧, headquartered in modern Xianyang, Shaanxi); Wang Fan (王璠) made the military governor of Hedong Circuit (河東, headquartered in modern Taiyuan, Shanxi); Luo Liyan (羅立言) made the acting mayor of Jingzhao; and Han Yue (韓約) made a general of the imperial guards; he had the four of them gather troops to be ready to act against the eunuchs. It was said that only Li Xun, Guo, Wang Fan, Luo, Han, Li Xiaoben (李孝本) the deputy chief imperial censor, and Shu were aware of Li Xun's plans.

On December 14, Li Xun acted, six days before the scheduled funeral for Wang, Han reported to Emperor Wenzong, at the imperial meeting hall Zichen Hall (紫宸殿), that there had been sweet dew (甘露, ganlu in Chinese) that appeared on a pomegranate tree outside the headquarters of Zuo Jinwu (左金吾), one of the Wei Army (衛軍) headquarters—viewed as a sign of divine favor. Emperor Wenzong then went to nearby Hanyuan Hall (含元殿) and ordered the imperial officials, including Li Xun, to examine the purported sweet dew. Li Xun soon returned and stated that it appeared that there was no sweet dew; at Li Xun's suggestion, Emperor Wenzong ordered Qiu and his fellow Shence Army commander Yu Hongzhi (魚弘志) to lead the eunuchs in examining the sweet dew. When Qiu and Yu arrived at the Zuo Jinwu headquarters, however, Han had lost his composure, and Qiu realized that something was wrong when he saw soldiers converging and the noise of weapons clanging. He and the other eunuchs immediately ran back to Hanyuan Hall and seized Emperor Wenzong. Li Xun tried to grab onto Emperor Wenzong's litter to stop the eunuchs from taking Emperor Wenzong back to the palace, and the soldiers under Luo and Li Xiaoben battled the eunuchs, killing a number of them, but the eunuchs were able to escort Emperor Wenzong back to the imperial palace. Knowing that he had lost this gambit, Li Xun put on the green uniform of chancellors' attendants and fled.

Li Xun fled to the Zhongnan Mountain (終南山) to try to seek refuge with the Buddhist monk Zongmi, with whom he was friendly. Zongmi wanted to give Li Xun a tonsure and disguise him as a monk, but Zongmi's followers urged him not to accept Li Xun. Li Xun thus exited Zhongnan Mountain and tried to flee to Fengxiang. He was, however, intercepted on the way by the defender of Zhouzhi (盩厔, in modern Xi'an), Song Chu (宋楚), who arrested him and had him delivered to Chang'an. When Li Xun's escort reached Kunming Pond (昆明池), Li Xun, fearful that the eunuchs would torture and humiliate him, told the officer escorting him:

Whoever has me will have riches and honor. I heard that the imperial guards are searching for me, and they will surely forcibly take me from you so that they would be rewarded. For your own benefit, it is better that you decapitate me and deliver my head.

The officer agreed and cut off his head to deliver it to Chang'an. Subsequently, at the grand public executions for Wang Ya, Wang Fan, Luo, Guo, Jia Su, Shu, and Li Xiaoben, Li Xun's head was raised by the Left Shence Army soldiers escorting Wang Ya, Wang Fan, Luo, and Guo. Li Xun's brother Li Zhongjǐng (李仲景) and cousin Li Yuangao (李元臯) were also killed, as were the rest of Li Xun's household. The bodies of Li Xun's household were exposed to the elements. It was only after a new year had passed that Emperor Wenzong ordered the Jingzhao Municipal Government to have the bodies buried in two mass graves.

It was said that after Li Xun's death, Emperor Wenzong missed him greatly, and often complimented his abilities to the subsequent chancellors Li Shi and Zheng Tan.

Li Xun's elder brother Li Zhongjīng (李仲京, note different note than his brother above) fled to Liu Congjian the reigning Military Governor of Zhaoyi. When Liu's nephew and successor Liu Zhen fell, Li Zhongjīng was also killed.

== Notes and references ==
- Old Book of Tang, vol. 169.
- New Book of Tang, vol. 179.
- Zizhi Tongjian, vols. 243, 245.
