= Jia Su =

Jia Su (賈餗) (died December 17, 835), courtesy name Zimei (子美), formally the Baron of Guzang (姑臧男), was an official of the Chinese Tang dynasty, serving briefly as a chancellor during the reign of Emperor Wenzong. During Emperor Wenzong's reign, he became involved in a major power struggle between imperial officials and eunuchs known as the Ganlu Incident, and he was killed by the eunuchs along with three other chancellors, Li Xun, Wang Ya, and Shu Yuanyu.

== Background and early career ==
It is not known when Jia Su was born, but it is known that his family was from Henan Municipality (河南, i.e., the region of the Tang dynasty eastern capital Luoyang). His family was originally from Guzang (姑臧, in modern Wuwei, Gansu). His grandfather's name was Jia Zhou (賈冑), and his father's name was Jia Ning (賈寧), and neither was listed with an office in the table of the chancellors' family trees in the New Book of Tang, suggesting that they were commoners. Jia Su had at least one older brother, Jia Song (賈竦).

It was said that Jia Su lost his father early in life and travelled in the region between the Yangtze River and the Huai River. When his uncle Jia Quan (賈全) became the governor of Zhedong Circuit (浙東, headquartered in modern Shaoxing, Zhejiang), Jia Su went to depend on Jia Quan. Jia Quan was impressed by his talents and treated him well.

At some point, Jia Su passed the imperial examinations in the Jinshi class — and did so well that he became well known. He also passed a special imperial examination for the talented and righteous, and thereafter was made the sheriff of Weinan County (渭南, in modern Weinan, Shaanxi) and an assistant at the Jixian Institute (集賢院). He was eventually promoted to be Kaogong Yuanwailang (考功員外郎), a low-level official at the ministry of civil service affairs (吏部, Libu), and put in charge of drafting edicts.

== During Emperor Muzong's and Emperor Jingzong's reigns ==
Early in the Changqing era (821-824) of Emperor Muzong, Jia Su and Bai Juyi were put in charge of grading a special imperial examination for those with strategies, and it was said that the popular opinion at the time was that Jia and Bai were fair graders. He was soon made Kubu Langzhong (庫部郎中), a supervisory official at the ministry of defense (兵部, Bingbu), and continued to be in charge of drafting edicts. It was said that Jia was an excellent writer, and was intelligent and decisive. However, he was also said that he was harsh and impatient, and he often insulted his colleagues. The senior advisory official Li Bo (李渤) disliked Jia and reported this to the chancellors, but because Li Fengji and Dou Yizhi favored Jia's talents, Jia was not demoted. (Note: The New Book of Tang account about Li Bo's report to the chancellors implied that Li Fengji and Dou were both chancellors at the time, but the account would then create a timing issue, as Dou did not become chancellor while Emperor Muzong was living. See Zizhi Tongjian, vol. 243.)

When Emperor Muzong died in 824 and was succeeded by his son Emperor Jingzong, Jia was one of the imperial emissaries sent out to the circuits to announce Emperor Muzong's death, and he was sent to the Yangtze-Qiantang River region. While he was thus on tour in the region, he was made the prefect of Chang Prefecture (常州, in modern Changzhou, Jiangsu), because of the machinations of the official Zhang Youxin (張又新). At that time, when imperial officials served as emissaries, they had guards in red uniforms leading the way for them, and as Jia reported to Chang Prefecture, he continued to use the guards. Jia's superior, Li Deyu the governor of Zhexi Circuit (浙西, headquartered in modern Zhenjiang, Jiangsu), ordered him to stop using the red-uniformed guards, much to Jia's resentment.

== During Emperor Wenzong's reign ==
Early in the Taihe era (827-835) of Emperor Jingzong's younger brother Emperor Wenzong, Jia Su was recalled to the capital Chang'an to serve the deputy minister of worship (太常少卿, Taichang Shaoqing). In 828, he was again put in charge of drafting imperial edicts. In 829, he was made Zhongshu Sheren (中書舍人), a mid-level official at the legislative bureau of government (中書省). In 830, he was put in charge of the imperial examinations, and after the roll of examinees who passed the examinations were issued in 831, he was officially made the deputy minister of rites (禮部侍郎, Libu Shilang). While serving at the minister of rites, he oversaw three classes of imperial examinees, and selected 75 of them for passage. It was said that among the 75 were many future high-level officials. In 833, he was made the deputy minister of defense (兵部侍郎, Bingbu Shilang). In 834, he was made the mayor of Jingzhao Municipality (京兆, i.e., the Chang'an region), and was also given the honorary title as chief imperial censor (御史大夫, Yushi Daifu).

It was while serving as the mayor of Jingzhao that Jia got into an incident involving protocol. In summer 835, Emperor Wenzong was holding a feast at Qujiang (曲江, near Chang'an). Pursuant to protocol at the time, when the mayor of Jingzhao arrived, he was supposed to get off his horse at the outer gates and greet the censors. Jia, however, arrogant at his high status as well as his association with the chancellor Li Zongmin and Emperor Wenzong's close associate Zheng Zhu, did not get off his horse and continued riding. When the low-level imperial censors Yang Jian (楊儉) and Su Te (蘇特) argued with him, he cursed at them. As a result, the advisory official Wen Zao (溫造) submitted an accusation against Jia, and Jia was punished by having his salary partially stripped. Jia, humiliated, requested to be sent out of the capital, and he was commissioned to be the governor of Zhexi Circuit — but before he could depart for Zhexi, he was made Zhongshu Shilang (中書侍郎), the deputy head of the legislative bureau, as well as chancellor de facto with the designation Tong Zhongshu Menxia Pingzhangshi (同中書門下平章事). He was also created the Baron of Guzang. (The modern historian Bo Yang believed that this sudden promotion after the incident was a case where Zheng was trying to display how much sway he had over the emperor.) Soon thereafter, he was also given the additional title as imperial scholar at Jixian Institute and put in charge of editing the imperial history.

Meanwhile, Emperor Wenzong, Zheng, and Jia's fellow chancellor Li Xun were plotting a slaughter of the powerful eunuchs, without Jia's knowledge. When Li Xun launched the plot (later known as the Ganlu Incident) on December 14, 835, the eunuchs seized Emperor Wenzong, and the plot failed. Li Xun fled out of Chang'an, while Jia and fellow chancellors Wang Ya and Shu Yuanyu returned to the Office of the Chancellors, believing that Emperor Wenzong would soon summon them to deal with the aftermaths, and they ordered the imperial officials under them to continue working normally. Soon thereafter, however, the eunuch-commanded Shence Army (神策軍) soldiers began attacking the governmental buildings, as the eunuchs believed the officials to be complicit with the plot. As the chancellors were about to have lunch, this was reported to them, and they fled. Jia spent a night in hiding in civilian clothing, but the next day, believing that he could not flee successfully anyway, changed into mourning clothes and rode a donkey to Xing'an Gate (興安門), informing the soldiers there, "I am Chancellor Jia Su. I was tainted by wicked people. Please deliver me to the Shence Army." The soldiers there did so. Meanwhile, the eunuchs submitted a confession that Wang Ya wrote after being tortured, in which he claimed that he and the other imperial officials had intended to overthrow Emperor Wenzong and replace him with Zheng, and Emperor Wenzong subsequently accepted the confession as true.

On December 17, the Shence Army soldiers escorted Jia, along with Wang Ya, Wang Fan (王璠), Luo Liyan (羅立言), Guo Xingyu (郭行餘), Shu, and Li Xiaoben (李孝本), along with Li Xun's head, to the imperial ancestral shrine, to be presented like sacrifices. They then were escorted to the execution field and executed by being cut in halves at the waist. Their families were slaughtered.

In his Zizhi Tongjian, the Song dynasty historian Sima Guang had this to say about Jia's and Wang Ya's deaths:

The commentators all state that Wang Ya and Jia Su were both talented in literary abilities and had good reputations, and that they did not know about the conspiracy of Li Xun and Zheng Zhu but were nevertheless massacred with their families. The commentators thus felt angry and sad for them and sighed about their undue death. I do not agree. If the state were falling and one cannot help right it, what use is a chancellor? Wang and Jia calmly held high positions and enjoyed the wealth and honors, at the same time that the wicked men led by Li and Zheng used their trickery and fraud to reach the positions of chancellorship. Wang and Jia sat with them and did not feel shame in doing so. The state faced disaster and disturbance and they did not worry. They lived their lives day by day. They thought that they had the wonderful strategy to protect themselves and that no one was more intelligent than they were. If everyone could do this and suffer no disaster, what wicked person would not do so? Instead, within an instant disaster fell, the feet of the ding broke, the food spilled, and punishments were carried out in dark rooms. It is that Heaven destroyed them, not Qiu Shiliang [(one of the leading eunuchs)].

Jia Su's son Jia Xiang (贾庠) fled to Liu Congjian the reigning Military Governor of Zhaoyi. When Liu's nephew and successor Liu Zhen fell, Jia Xiang was also killed.

In the subsequent reign of Emperor Wenzong's uncle Emperor Xuānzong, Jia's and Wang Ya's reputations and titles were posthumously restored.
