= Shu Yuanyu =

Tang dynasty official

Shu Yuanyu (Chinese: 舒元輿; c. 791 - December 17, 835) was an official of the Chinese Tang dynasty, serving briefly as a chancellor during the reign of Emperor Wenzong. During Emperor Wenzong's reign, he became involved in a major power struggle between imperial officials and eunuchs known as the Ganlu Incident, and he was killed by the eunuchs (via waist chop) along with three other chancellors, Li Xun, Wang Ya, and Jia Su.

== Background ==
Shu Yuanyu was born in about 791 and he was from Wu Prefecture (婺州, in modern Jinhua, Zhejiang), from a part that was said to be so poor that the gentry avoided it. His father Shu Heng (舒恆) served as an officer at Wuchang Circuit (武昌, headquartered in modern Wuhan, Hubei). Shu Yuanyu had at least three younger brothers—Shu Yuangong (舒元肱), Shu Yuanjiong (舒元迥), and Shu Yuanbao (舒元褒), each of whom (like he) would eventually pass the imperial examinations in the Jinshi class.

It was said that when Shu Yuanyu began his studies, he became known for his alertness and ability to understand. He later went to live in Jiangxia (江夏, i.e., Wuchang's capital), and the military governor (Jiedushi) Chi Shimei (郗士美) came to be impressed by his talent and often praised him.

In 813, during the reign of Emperor Xianzong, Shu passed the imperial examinations and was made the sheriff of Hu County (鄠縣, in modern Xi'an, Shaanxi); he was to be talented and to have gained a good reputation. When the former chancellor Pei Du served as the military governor of Shannan West Circuit (山南西道, headquartered in modern Hanzhong, Shaanxi), he invited Shu to serve as his scribe, and it was said that the declarations that Shu drafted for him were written so well that Shu's reputation for good writing became well known.

== During Emperor Wenzong's reign ==
Early in the Taihe (827-835) era of Emperor Xianzong's grandson Emperor Wenzong, Shu Yuanyu was recalled to the capital Chang'an to serve as an imperial censor, initially with the low title of Jiancha Yushi (監察御史), later with the higher title of Shi Yushi (侍御史). While serving as a censor, it was said that he was fearless in accusing officials he considered corrupt.

As Shu considered himself highly talented, he was ambitious in seeking higher officer. In 831, he submitted a petition to Emperor Wenzong in which he attached his writing and compared himself to the earlier chancellors Ma Zhou and Zhang Jiazhen, as well as to the Han dynasty officials Zhufu Yan (主父偃), Xu Yue (徐樂), and Yan An (嚴安). Emperor Wenzong was impressed with his writing and showed the petition to the chancellors. The chancellor Li Zongmin, however, considered Shu frivolous and overly ambitious, and he made Shu Zhuzuolang (著作郎), a writer at the Palace Library, and sent Shu to the eastern capital Luoyang.

While Shu was at Luoyang, he became friendly with Li Zhongyan, who was then there observing a mourning period for his mother. Eventually, when Li Zhongyan (whose name was then changed to Li Xun) became a close associate of Emperor Wenzong's, Shu was recalled to Chang'an to serve as Zuosi Langzhong (左司郎中), a supervisory official at the executive bureau of government (尚書省, Shangshu Sheng). When Li Guyan served as the chief imperial censor, he requested that Shu oversee the miscellaneous matters at the Office of the Imperial Censors (御史臺). Subsequently, when Li Guyan became chancellor, at his request, Shu was made acting deputy chief imperial censor (御史中丞). It was said that Shu impressed Emperor Wenzong by ruling on criminal cases quickly, such that the backlog dissipated within three months, and thereafter was made deputy minister of justice (刑部侍郎, Xingbu Shilang). However, he associated closely with Li Xun and another close associate of Emperor Wenzong's, Zheng Zhu, and it was said that he used the law as a tool against those Li Xun and Zheng disfavored. For example, when Zheng accused relatives of the mayor of Jingzhao (京兆, i.e., the Chang'an region), Yang Yuqing (楊虞卿), of spreading rumors that Zheng was using infant hearts and livers to make immortality pills for Emperor Wenzong, Shu, following Zheng's lead, had Yang quickly found guilty. Soon thereafter, both Li Xun and Shu were made chancellors with the designation Tong Zhongshu Menxia Pingzhangshi (同中書門下平章事). It was said that while serving as chancellors, Li Xun and Shu often machinated together on how they could seize more power, including in the plot that Li Xun, Zheng, and Emperor Wenzong were forming against the powerful eunuchs. However, it was also said that Li Xun and Shu, in order to gain good reputation, honored senior officials who had been squeezed out by prior chancellors, including Pei Du, Linghu Chu, and Zheng Tan.

With Shu's knowledge, but the knowledge of no other chancellor, Li Xun launched his plot (later known as the Ganlu Incident) on December 14, 835, The plot quickly failed, however, as the eunuchs seized Emperor Wenzong, and Li Xun's troops collapsed. Li Xun fled out of Chang'an, while Shu and fellow chancellors Wang Ya and Jia Su returned to the Office of the Chancellors, believing that Emperor Wenzong would soon summon them to deal with the aftermaths, and they ordered the imperial officials under them to continue working normally. Soon thereafter, however, the eunuch-commanded Shence Army (神策軍) soldiers began attacking the governmental buildings, as the eunuchs believed the officials to be complicit with the plot. As the chancellors were about to have lunch, this was reported to them, and they fled. Shu changed into civilian clothes and rode out of Anhua Gate (安化門), but was chased down by Shence Army soldiers and arrested. Meanwhile, the eunuchs submitted a confession that Wang Ya wrote after being tortured, in which he claimed that he and the other imperial officials had intended to overthrow Emperor Wenzong and replace him with Zheng, and Emperor Wenzong subsequently accepted the confession as true.

On December 17, the Shence Army soldiers escorted Shu, along with Wang Ya, Wang Fan (王璠), Luo Liyan (羅立言), Guo Xingyu (郭行餘), Jia, and Li Xiaoben (李孝本), along with Li Xun's head, to the imperial ancestral shrine, to be presented like sacrifices. They then were escorted to the execution field and executed by being cut in halves at the waist. Their families were slaughtered. His brothers Shu Yuangong and Shu Yuanjiong were also killed. Shu had written an ode to peonies that was considered well written, and after Shu's death, there was an occasion when Emperor Wenzong viewed peonies and recited the ode; he wept and mourned Shu.

== Notes and references ==
- Old Book of Tang, vol. 169.
- New Book of Tang, vol. 179.
- Zizhi Tongjian, vol. 245.
