= Zheng Zhu =

Chinese physician

Zheng Zhu (鄭注; died December 18, 835), probably né Yu Zhu (魚注), was an official of the Chinese Tang dynasty. He became a trusted advisor to Emperor Wenzong due to treatments he provided Emperor Wenzong for the emperor's illnesses, and thereafter plotted with Emperor Wenzong and Li Xun to slaughter the powerful eunuchs. However, after the plot (later known as the Ganlu Incident) failed, Li Xun and he were both killed, along with many other officials that the eunuchs suspected of being complicit.

== Background ==
It is not known when Zheng Zhu was born. His family name was originally Yu（魚）, but he changed his name to Zheng at some point. He was skilled in medicine, and with his skills, he was able to associate with the powerful people in the Tang dynasty capital Chang'an. (As Yu means "fish" in Chinese, eventually, when Zheng became powerful, he was sometimes obliquely referred to as "the one from the water.")

In 818, when the general Li Su served as the military governor of Shannan East Circuit (山南東道, headquartered in modern Xiangfan, Hubei), Zheng went to serve under Li Su, and as Li Su received medical services from Zheng, he became trusting of Zheng and commissioned Zheng as a guard commander. Later, when Li Su was moved to be the military governor of Wuning Circuit (武寧, headquartered in modern Xuzhou, Jiangsu), Zheng followed him, and became even more involved in the decisions. It was said that Zheng was treacherous but well-spoken, and was capable of detecting what people desired, and therefore, the suggestions he made Li Su were the ones that pleased Li Su. As a result, he became quite powerful at the headquarters, and the officers feared him. At that time, the eunuch Wang Shoucheng served as the monitor of Wuning, and Wang disliked Zheng immensely, and, on one occasion, Wang pointed out how the army was resentful of Zheng. Li Su stated to Wang, "Although it is true, Zheng is an amazing man. You, general, should meet him. If you disagree, then he can be removed." Li Su then had Zheng meet Wang. Wang initially did not want to and refused to seat Zheng, but once Zheng began talking with him, Wang was pleased with Zheng's analyses, and invited Zheng in to talk further. Thereafter, Zheng became a close associate of Wang's.

== Association with Wang Shoucheng ==
Wang Shoucheng was later recalled to Chang'an to serve as one of the directors of palace communication (shumishi) and became very powerful. Zheng Zhu maintained close association with Wang, and it was said that those who wanted positions could bribe Zheng and have him persuade Wang to have them commissioned, such that people were anxious to ingratiate him.

As of 831, then-reigning Emperor Wenzong was plotting with the chancellor Song Shenxi to eliminate the powerful eunuchs. Song involved the mayor of Jingzhao Municipality (京兆, i.e., the Chang'an region), Wang Fan (王璠), in the planning, and as part of the planning, Wang Fan was to have Zheng killed. Wang Fan, however, leaked the plan to Zheng, who in turn informed Wang Shoucheng. At Zheng's suggestion, Wang Shoucheng, who was then the commander of one of the Shence Armies (神策軍), had Doulu Zhu, one of his officers submit an accusation that Song and Emperor Wenzong's brother Li Cou the Prince of Zhang were plotting to remove Emperor Wenzong and replace him with Li Cou. Emperor Wenzong believed the accusations and had Song and Li Cou arrested. Emperor Wenzong initially were set to execute Song, but the other officials urged a thorough investigation. Zheng was fearful that a thorough investigation would show that the accusations were not true, and therefore had Wang suggest to Emperor Wenzong that Song and Li Cou be spared; however, both were demoted and exiled.

Subsequently, the imperial guard general Meng Wenliang (孟文亮) was made the military governor of Binning Circuit (邠寧, headquartered in modern Xianyang, Shaanxi), and he requested that Zheng be made commander of in his army. Zheng, however, refused to accompany him to Binning. Only after the deputy chief imperial censor Yuwen Ding (宇文鼎) submitted an accusation against Zheng for insubordination did Zheng depart toward Binning, but he never reached Binning before turning back to Chang'an. The imperial censor Li Kuan (李款) submitted a harshly-worded accusation against Zheng, but as the chancellor who received the accusation, Wang Ya, had himself ingratiated Zheng and been commissioned due to Wang Shoucheng's recommendation, Wang Ya suppressed the accusation and did not act on it. The military governor of Zhaoyi Circuit (昭義, headquartered in modern Changzhi, Shanxi), Liu Congjian, wanted to remove Zheng and his influence from the capital, and therefore recommended Zheng to be his deputy military governor. After only a few months, however, Emperor Wenzong suffered a stroke and, for some time, was unable to speak. Wang Shoucheng recommended Zheng to him, and so Zheng was recalled to treat Emperor Wenzong. Zheng was able to help Emperor Wenzong's conditions to improve, and Emperor Wenzong thereafter associated closely with Zheng.

== Association with Emperor Wenzong ==
It was said that Zheng Zhu wore clothes made of deer skin, and considered himself a hermit. As a result, Emperor Wenzong treated him as an advisor and a friend, not as a subject.

Meanwhile, Li Zhongyan, who met Wang Shoucheng through Li Fengji, was also recommended by Wang to Emperor Wenzong, based on Li Zhongyan's knowledge of the I Ching. Thereafter, Li Zhongyan also became a close associate of Emperor Wenzong's, despite the opposition of the chancellor Li Deyu. Soon thereafter, because Zheng, Li Zhongyan, and Wang all resented Li Deyu, they persuaded Emperor Wenzong to recall Li Deyu's political enemy, the former chancellor Li Zongmin, to Chang'an to again serve as chancellor. Li Deyu was subsequently removed from his chancellor position.

Around the new year 835, Emperor Wenzong commissioned Zheng as the minister of agriculture (太僕卿, Taipu Qing). As the advisory official Zheng Chenggu (鄭承嘏) opposed the appointment harshly, Zheng Zhu initially declined it, but eventually accepted in summer 835. Meanwhile, he was grateful to Wang Fan for having revealed Song Shenxi's plan to have him killed, and because Wang Fan was also friendly with Li Zhongyan (whose name was changed by this point to Li Xun), they jointly recommended that Wang Fan be recalled from his position as the governor of Zhexi Circuit (浙西, headquartered in modern Zhenjiang, Jiangsu) to serve as one of the secretaries general of the executive bureau of government (尚書省, Shangshu Sheng).

In spring 835, Zheng Zhu informed Emperor Wenzong that he believed that the signs were that the lands of the old Qin region (i.e., the Chang'an region) would suffer disaster, and it could only be averted with major construction. As a result, Emperor Wenzong ordered 1,500 Shence Army soldiers to dredge Qu River (曲江) and Kunming Pond (昆明池). Meanwhile, Wang Fan and Li Han (李漢) accused Li Deyu of having conspired with Li Cou and Li Cou's wet nurse Du Zhongyang (杜仲陽). Emperor Wenzong thereafter summoned the chancellors, Zheng, Wang, and Li Han to discuss this matter further. Emperor Wenzong initially believed Li Deyu's guilt and was incensed, but after the chancellor Lu Sui spoke in Li Deyu's defense, Li Deyu was reduced to an honorary post but not further punished. (Lu himself, however, would soon be demoted to be the military governor of Zhenhai Circuit (i.e., Zhexi Circuit) as a result of his defending Li Deyu.)

Meanwhile, the mayor of Jingzhao, Jia Su, was a political enemy of Li Deyu's and friendly with Li Zongmin and Zheng. At an imperial feast, Jia was supposed to get off his horse and bow to the imperial censors, but Jia refused to do so. The junior censors Yang Jian (楊儉) and Su Te (蘇特) pointed this out and argued with him, and when he cursed them, submitted an accusation against Jia. As a result, Jia was given a fine. Jia, humiliated, initially requested an assignment outside the capital, but before he could depart, Emperor Wenzong promoted Jia to be chancellor. (According to comments by the modern historian Bo Yang, this commission was Zheng's way of showing that he had the power to make people chancellors.)

In summer 835, there was a rumor that spread throughout Chang'an that Zheng was making immortality pills for Emperor Wenzong, and the ingredients included infants' hearts and livers. The public fell into a panic. Emperor Wenzong was incensed by the rumors, and as Zheng had long disliked the new mayor of Jingzhao, Yang Yuqing (楊虞卿), he and Li Xun accused Yang's family members of having started the rumors. Emperor Wenzong arrested Yang. Li Zongmin tried to defend Yang, but as he had refused to allow Zheng to have a position in either the legislative bureau (中書省, Zhongshu Sheng) or examination bureau (門下省, Menxia Sheng), Zheng had also become resentful of him. Thereafter, when Li Zongmin tried to personally intercede on Yang's behalf, Emperor Wenzong had Li Zongmin removed from his presence and demoted to be the prefect of Ming Prefecture (明州, in modern Ningbo, Zhejiang).

By this point, however, even though Zheng and Li Zongmin were recommended by Wang Shoucheng, Emperor Wenzong, who had long been resentful of the powerful eunuchs, was discussing with them what to do about the eunuchs—particularly because they, due to their association with Wang, would not draw the suspicions of the eunuchs. They thereafter began planning how to slaughter the eunuchs. At Zheng's and Li Xun's suggestion, Emperor Wenzong diverted some of the military power from Wang by giving command of one of the Shence Armies to Wang's enemy, the eunuch Qiu Shiliang, while demoting three other powerful eunuchs, Wei Yuansu (韋元素), Yang Chenghe (楊承和), and Wang Jianyan (王踐言), to circuit eunuch monitor positions. Eventually, Emperor Wenzong ordered the three to commit suicide. Meanwhile, Li Xun and Zheng mapped out a three-step plan for Emperor Wenzong to pacify the empire—first eliminate the eunuchs, then recover the lands lost to Tufan, and then wiping out the warlords north of the Yellow River, with details. Emperor Wenzong was impressed and trusted them even more.

Zheng also further revealed that Li Zongmin's initial commission as chancellor in 829 was due to his association with the female imperial scholar Song Ruoxian (宋若憲) and Yang Chenghe. Li Zongmin was thereafter further demoted, while the official who was in charge of the investigation against Yang Yuqing, Shu Yuanyu, was promoted to be chancellor. It was said that Li Xun and Zheng also used to opportunity to take vengeance on anyone they disliked—by accusing any such person to be an associate of Li Deyu's or Li Zongmin's.

In fall 835, Zheng requested to be the military governor of Fengxiang Circuit (鳳翔, headquartered in modern Baoji, Shaanxi), but the chancellor Li Guyan refused. Emperor Wenzong reacted by making Zheng the military governor of Fengxiang and Li Guyan the military governor of Shannan West Circuit (山南西道, headquartered in modern Hanzhong, Shaanxi).

== Ganlu Incident and death ==
Zheng Zhu's commission as the military governor of Fengxiang, unknown to the others, was part of his plot with Li Xun and Emperor Wenzong—with the plan being that Zheng would be able to gather troops at Fengxiang and use it in an eventual confrontation with the eunuchs. However, at this point, unknown to Zheng and Emperor Wenzong, Li Xun himself had become suspicious and jealous of Zheng, and therefore, when Li Xun was selecting a staff for Zheng, he chose those who were moderate in their behavior for Zheng. Meanwhile, at the suggestion of Li Xun and Zheng, Emperor Wenzong gave Wang Shoucheng the highly honored title of monitor of the Shence Armies, in order to actually strip him of the power of commanding the Shence Armies. Soon thereafter, Shu Yuanyu and Li Xun were both made chancellors.

Meanwhile, Zheng's predecessor Li Ting (李聽), who was a son of the famed general Li Sheng (and a brother of Li Su's) and who looked down at Zheng, was disrespectful to him. After Zheng arrived at Fengxiang, he submitted a report that accused Li Ting of being cruel and corrupt. As a result, Li Ting was stripped of his post as the military governor of Zhongwu Circuit (忠武, headquartered in modern Xuchang, Henan). Zheng also suggested that the way to make the state and the people wealthy was to collect tea taxes. Emperor Wenzong thus made Wang Ya assume the additional post as the collector of tea taxes, and while Wang Ya knew that tea taxes would create problems for the people, he nevertheless collected the taxes. Also, at Li Xun's and Zheng's suggestion, Emperor Wenzong had poison wine sent to Wang Shoucheng to poison him to death.

Wang Shoucheng's death was a part of further planning by Emperor Wenzong, Li Xun, and Zheng—the plan was that when Wang was set to be buried on December 20, 835, Zheng, who claimed that he was grateful to Wang, would take his personal guards, who were armed with sharp axes, with him to attend the funeral. At the funeral, the guards would then surround the eunuchs and slaughter them. However, Li Xun discussed the plan with his associates, and he concluded that if that were to happen, Zheng would receive all of the credit, and therefore he resolved to act before Zheng would, planning to kill Zheng as well after he succeeded.

On December 14, Li Xun acted. He had the imperial guard general Han Yue (韓約) claim that sweet dews (甘露, ganlu in Chinese) had formed on trees on a pomegranate tree outside his headquarters. Then, he had Emperor Wenzong order the eunuchs to examine the sweet dews. When the eunuchs, led by Qiu Shiliang and fellow Shence Army commander Yu Hongzhi (魚弘志), arrived at the scene, Han's anxiety, as well as sounds of arms clanging, gave away the fact that the soldiers under Han, Wang Fan, and another associate of Li Xun's, Guo Xingyu (郭行餘), were about to act against the eunuchs. Qiu and the other eunuchs immediately returned to Hanyuan Hall (含元殿), where Emperor Wenzong was at the time, and seized Emperor Wenzong, taking him back to the palace. They then mobilized the Shence Armies, and the Shence Armies slaughtered the troops aligned with Li Xun, and then killed a large number of governmental officials, including Li Xun, Wang Ya, Shu Yuanyu, and Jia Su, under the claimed crime that they were planning to overthrow Emperor Wenzong and support Zheng as the new emperor.

Meanwhile, Zheng had already departed from Fengxiang, heading toward Chang'an, and was at Fufeng (扶風, in modern Baoji). The magistrate of Fufeng County, Han Liao (韓遼), became aware of Zheng's plan, and therefore refused to supply him and fled to Wugong (武功, in modern Xianyang). When Zheng received news that Li Xun had failed, he returned to Fengxiang. His subordinate Wei Hongjie (魏弘節) suggested to him that he kill the eunuch monitor of Fengxiang, Zhang Zhongqing (張仲卿), as well as a number of officers, but Zheng, terrified, did not know what to do. At the same time, Qiu had an edict in Emperor Wenzong's name delivered to Zhang ordering Zhang to act against Zheng. Zhang initially also was not sure how to act, but under suggestion from the officer Li Shuhe (李叔和), Zhang invited Zheng to a feast. LI Shuhe gave Zheng's guards food and drink, and then, at the feast, while Zheng was not paying attention, killed and decapitated him. He then had Zheng's guards, Zheng's household, as well as a large number of Zheng's staff members, slaughtered. Zhang had Li Shuhe deliver Zheng's head to Chang'an—where the eunuchs had readied the troops in case of an attack by Zheng, causing much panic in the people of Chang'an. Only after Zheng's head was hung on Xing'an Gate (興安門) was it said that the people were calmed somewhat. It was said that very few of Zheng's relatives survived the incident.

== Notes and references ==
- Old Book of Tang, vol. 169.
- New Book of Tang, vol. 179.
- Zizhi Tongjian, vols. 243, 244, 245.
