= Quan Deyu =

Quan Deyu (Chinese: 權德輿; 759 – September 30, 818), courtesy name Zaizhi (載之), formally Duke Wen of Fufeng (扶風文公), was an official of the Chinese Tang dynasty, serving as a chancellor during the reign of Emperor Xianzong.

== Biography ==
=== Ancestry, birth and early life ===
Quan Deyu was born in 759, (Note: Quan Deyu's biographies in the Old Book of Tang indicated that he was 59 when he died in 818, giving a birth date of 759. However, he was also said to be six years old when his father Quan Gao died in 768, which, if true, would make his birth date 762. See Old Book of Tang, vol. 148.) during the reign of Emperor Suzong. His family was from Tianshui. His family claimed descendance from the Later Qin official Quan Yi, although the traceable part of his family tree was from the Sui dynasty official Quan Rong (權榮). Quan Deyu's male-line ancestors, after Quan Rong, served as officials for the Tang dynasty, although Quan Deyu's grandfather Quan Chui (權倕) was not listed with any official titles. Quan Deyu's father Quan Gao (權皋) was well known for his avoidance of being involved in the rebellions of An Lushan and Li Lin.

Quan Deyu himself was said to be capable of writing poetry at age three. When his father Quan Chui died, he observed a mourning period and was said to behave filially piously during that period. At age 14, he wrote hundreds of essays, which were compiled into a 10-volume collection known as the Collection from a Learned Child (童蒙集) and he thus became famous.

=== During Emperor Dezong's reign ===
When the official Han Hui (韓洄) served as surveyor of the Henan region (河南), the region immediately south of the Yellow River, (Note: Han Hui's biography in the New Book of Tang, however, did not indicate that he served a term as the surveyor of Henan, but instead indicated that he served a term as the surveyor of Huainan (淮南) — i.e., the region directly south of the Huai River. If Quan served under Han when Han was surveying Huainan, then that would be early in Emperor Dezong's reign. See New Book of Tang, vol. 126. (Han's biography in the Old Book of Tang did not mention a term as a surveyor at all. See Old Book of Tang, vol. 129.)) he invited Quan Deyu to serve as his secretary. Early in the Zhenyuan era (785-805) of Emperor Daizong's son Emperor Dezong, Quan served on the staff of Li Jian (李兼) the governor (觀察使, Guanchashi) of Jiangxi Circuit (江西, headquartered in modern Nanchang, Jiangxi). When his term of service under Li Jian finished, two other regional governors, Du You and Pei Zhou (裴冑) both invited him to serve on their respective staffs whilst both their requests for his service arrived at the capital Chang'an at the same time. As Emperor Dezong had also heard that Quan had a good reputation, he summoned Quan to serve as Taichang Boshi (太常博士), a consultant at the Ministry of Worship (太常寺, Taichang Si), and later as Zuo Bujue (左補闕), a low-level consultant at the Chancellory, also known as the Edict Examination Bureau (門下省, Menxia Sheng).

While Quan served in Emperor Dezong's administration, he submitted advice to Emperor Dezong that was at times listened to. For example, in 792, following a major flood in the Guandong region (關東), the territory east of modern Sanmenxia, Henan, it was on Quan's advice that Emperor Dezong dispatched four imperial officials to comfort the victims. In 793, Quan submitted a petition criticizing the frivolous nature of Emperor Dezong's trusted Director of Finances, Pei Yanling, but in this case Quan's advice was ignored. In 794, Quan became Imperial Archivist (起居舍人, Qiju Sheren), and was soon also put in charge of drafting edicts. Whilst serving in that capacity, he received several successive promotions in title — to Jiabu Yuanwailang (駕部員外郎), a low-level official at the Ministry of Rites; Sixun Langzhong (司勳郎中), a supervisorial official at the Ministry of Personnel (吏部) and Zhongshu Sheren (中書舍人), a mid-level official at the Imperial Secretariat (中書省, Zhongshu Sheng). When Quan started serving as the drafter of edicts, he shared the responsibilities with Xu Dai (徐岱) and Gao Ying, but as Xu and Gao were later transferred to other responsibilities, Quan ended up with sole responsibility for drafting edicts. He once pointed out that doing so was inappropriate — as the emperor needed to have multiple staff in charge of the task to avoid having a single person abuse power. However, Emperor Dezong responded, "It is not that I do not know that I am overworking you, but I cannot find anyone with your abilities." In the winter of 801, Quan became responsible for the Imperial examinations at the Ministry of Rites. The next year, he was made deputy Minister of Rites (禮部侍郎, Libu Shilang). and thus responsible for imperial examination for three straight years. Records show that he was a good selector of talented examinees. He was later made Deputy Minister of the Ministry of Revenue (戶部侍郎, Hubu Shilang).

=== During Emperor Xianzong's reign ===
Early in the Yuanhe era (805-821) of Emperor Dezong's grandson Emperor Xianzong, Quan Deyu served as the deputy minister of defense (兵部侍郎, Bingbu Shilang) and then deputy minister of civil service affairs (吏部侍郎, Libu Shilang). After an incident in which his subordinates selected inappropriate officials, however, he was made Taizi Binke (太子賓客), an advisor to the Crown Prince, (Note: However, as there was no crown prince at the time, the title was entirely honorary.) before he was again made the deputy minister of defense. He later was made the minister of worship (太常卿, Taichang Qing). While serving as the minister of worship, there was an occasion when Yang Ping (楊憑) the mayor of Jingzhao Municipality (京兆, i.e., the Chang'an region) was indicted for corruption, exiled, and demoted to be a sheriff. When a sheriff, Xu Hui (徐晦), who had served under Yang, went to send Yang off as he was leaving Chang'an, Quan, who was friendly with Xu, warned him that doing so might hurt his prospects of promotion. Xu pointed out that Yang had treated him well while even while Yang was a commoner, and that it was proper to send him off — commenting that if one day Quan were falsely accused and exiled, surely he would also send Quan off. Quan was impressed and praised Xu while meeting other officials. The chief deputy imperial censor who indicted Yang, Li Yijian, thus retained Xu as an imperial censor.

In 810, after the chancellor Pei Ji suffered a stroke, Emperor Xianzong made Quan the minister of rites (禮部尚書, Libu Shangshu) and chancellor de facto with the title Tong Zhongshu Menxia Pingzhangshi (同中書門下平章事). Later that year, when Emperor Xianzong was intending to award the military governor (Jiedushi) Wang E (王鍔) an honorary chancellor title, Quan and fellow chancellor Li Fan earnestly opposed on the ground that Wang had no great accomplishments that warranted the title, and Emperor Xianzong ultimately did not give Wang such title. In 811, when Emperor Xianzong asked the chancellors for their opinions on whether he should govern harshly or leniently, Quan advocated for a lenient rule, arguing that Qin dynasty was destroyed quickly due to its harshness and that Han dynasty persisted due to its leniency, further arguing that Tang itself survived various rebellions since the Anshi Rebellion because Emperor Taizong had been lenient and thus gained the deep loyalty of the people. Later that year, after the officials Yu Gaomo (于皋謨) and Dong Xi (董溪) were found to have been corrupt, Emperor Xianzong ordered them exiled, but after they left Chang'an sent eunuchs to order them to commit suicide. Quan submitted a petition pointing out that it was wrong to initially spare Yu and Dong from death and then, after some time, nevertheless put them to death. Emperor Xianzong agreed with him. (Note: However, none of the traditional historical accounts of the incident indicated whether, by that point, Yu and Dong were already dead.)

Meanwhile, Quan had been serving with fellow chancellors Li Jifu and Li Jiang during this time. At this time, due to Emperor Xianzong's desire for effective governance, he granted great authority to the chancellors. Li Jifu and Li Jiang often had disagreements in their exercise of authority and often broke into arguments before Emperor Xianzong. Quan rarely took a side in these arguments and was often silent. As a result, Emperor Xianzong lost his respect for Quan, and in 813, he removed Quan from his chancellor position, having him serve just as the minister of rites. He was soon thereafter made the defender of the eastern capital Luoyang, then the minister of worship again, and then the minister of justice (刑部尚書, Xingbu Shangshu). He was also created the Duke of Fufeng. Previously, the officials Xu Mengrong (許孟容) and Jiang Ai (蔣乂) had been commissioned to revise the Tang laws, but as Xu was soon transferred to another position, Jiang had to individually complete the 30-volume revision. After Jiang submitted the work, however, the emperor did not promulgate it. Quan and his deputy minister Liu Bochu (劉伯芻) then further revised the work and submitted it in 815. In 816, Quan was made the military governor of Shannan West Circuit (山南西道, headquartered in modern Hanzhong, Shaanxi). In fall 818, he fell ill, and Emperor Xianzong issued an edict allowing him to return to his own mansion in Chang'an to recuperate. On the way, Quan died. He was given posthumous honors.

== Names ==
His courtesy name was Zaizhi.

== Cited works ==
- Ueki, Hisayuki; Uno, Naoto; Matsubara, Akira (1999). "Shijin to Shi no Shōgai (Ken Tokuyo)". In Matsuura, Tomohisa (ed.). Kanshi no Jiten 漢詩の事典 (in Japanese). Tokyo: Taishūkan Shoten. p. 113. OCLC 41025662.
