= Tutu Chengcui =

Tutu Chengcui (Chinese: 吐突承璀; died 820), courtesy name Renzhen (仁貞), was a powerful eunuch of the Chinese Tang dynasty, during the reign of Emperor Xianzong.

== Background ==
It is not known when Tutu Chengcui was born—or whether he was originally surnamed Tutu, although, as it is known that he was from the Min region (閩, roughly modern Fujian), it would appear doubtful, as Tutu was largely a Xianbei surname. Early in his career as an eunuch, he served at the eastern palace (i.e., the crown prince's palace) and later served as a supervising eunuch at the textile agency (掖庭局, Yiting Ju) within the eunuch bureau (內侍省, Neishi Sheng). It was said that he was dextrous, intelligent, and capable. While he was serving at the Crown Prince's palace, he served under Li Chun the Prince of Guangling, a son of then-crown prince Li Song (who was a son of then-reigning Emperor Dezong).

== During Emperor Xianzong's reign ==
In 805, Emperor Dezong died, and Li Song became emperor (as Emperor Shunzong), but as Emperor Shunzong was himself severely ill at that point, he yielded the throne to Li Chun later in the year (as Emperor Xianzong). Emperor Xianzong made Tutu Chengcui Neichangshi (內常侍)—the secretary general of the eunuch bureau, serving as the acting head of the eunuch bureau. In 806, Tutu was also made the commander (中尉, Zhongwei) of the Left Shence Army (左神策軍), as well as the director of religious affairs (功德使, Gongdeshi).

In 809, one of the key military governors (jiedushi) who had been ruling their circuits in a de facto independent manner—Wang Shizhen the military governor of Chengde Circuit (成德, headquartered in modern Shijiazhuang, Hebei)—died. Wang Shizhen's son Wang Chengzong declared himself acting military governor. In the past, these successions were routinely approved by the imperial government, but Emperor Xianzong, wanting to reassert imperial authority, hesitated in doing so and considered taking the control of Chengde back by force. The chancellor Pei Ji opposed military action, but Tutu volunteered to command an army against Wang Chengzong. Meanwhile, Lu Congshi (盧從史) the military governor of Zhaoyi Circuit (昭義, headquartered in modern Changzhi, Shanxi) wanted imperial favor, and offered, through Tutu, to attack Wang as well, causing Emperor Xianzong to consider military action further.

Meanwhile, around the same time, there was an incident where Tutu, in his role as director of religious affairs, remodeled Anguo Temple (安國寺) and, in the process, built a magnificent stele and asked for Emperor Xianzong to designate an official to author the text of the stele, to praise Emperor Xianzong. Emperor Xianzong asked the imperial scholar Li Jiang to do so, but Li Jiang pointed out that of the great rulers of antiquity, none erected monuments to praise himself, and the poorly regarded Qin Shi Huang did. Emperor Xianzong thus ordered Tutu to destroy the stele.

To resolve the standoff, Wang Chengzong offered to surrender two of Chengde's six prefectures—De (德州, in modern Dezhou, Shandong) and Di (棣州, in modern Binzhou, Shandong)—to imperial control as a new Baoxin Circuit. Emperor Xianzong was set to accept the offer and make Wang military governor, but Wang soon retracted the offer and arrested Xue Changchao (薛昌朝), whom Emperor Xianzong was set to commission as the military governor of Baoxin. In winter 809, Emperor Xianzong stripped Wang of his titles and commissioned Tutu as the commander of the forces against Chengde. Many officials, including Bai Juyi, Li Yuansu (李元素), Li Yong, Xu Mengrong (許孟容), Li Yijian, Meng Jian (孟簡), Lü Yuanying (呂元膺), Mu Zhi (穆質), and Dugu Yu (獨孤郁), opposed the commission, arguing that generals would feel ashamed serving under a eunuch. Emperor Xianzong reduced Tutu's title slightly but kept him in command.

In spring 810, Tutu arrived at the northern front against Chengde, but it was said that he lacked the respect of the generals, and the military actions were therefore less than successful. In particular, after one key imperial general, Li Dingjin (酈定進) was killed in battle, the morale took a major blow. Meanwhile, Tutu and Emperor Xianzong became aware that while Lu Congshi had initially encouraged military action against Chengde, he was actually secretly in communications with Chengde and interfering with the military action. Tutu thus befriended Lu by giving Lu various treasures as gifts. Once Lu's guard was down, on one occasion when Lu was at Tutu's headquarters, Tutu had him arrested and had Lu's subordinate Wu Chongyin take control of the Zhaoyi army. Tutu subsequently recommended Wu to succeed Lu, but at the suggestion of Li Jiang, Emperor Xianzong made Wu the military governor of Heyang Circuit (河陽, headquartered in modern Jiaozuo, Henan) and made Meng Yuanyang (孟元陽) the military governor of Heyang Circuit the new military governor of Zhaoyi. After Lu's arrest, Wang submitted a petition offering to submit and accusing Lu of having alienated him from the imperial government. As imperial forces were having no success against Wang by that point, Emperor Xianzong recalled Tutu's army and exonerated Wang and his soldiers, making Wang the military governor of Chengde.

After Tutu returned to the capital Chang'an, Emperor Xianzong initially had him resume the command of the Left Shence Army. However, Pei, Duan Pingzhong (段平仲), Lü, and Li Jiang all advocated that, because Tutu was unable to defeat Wang as he promised, he should be punished. Emperor Xianzong, in response, demoted Tutu to be the director of armory supplies (軍器使, Junqishi). It was said that people celebrated Tutu's demotion.

In 811, Tutu's subordinate Liu Xiguang (劉希光) was found to have received bribes from the general Sun Rui (孫瑞) to help make Sun a military governor. Liu was forced to commit suicide, and during the investigation, Tutu was implicated. Emperor Xianzong thus demoted Tutu out of the capital to serve as the monitoring eunuch at Huainan Circuit (淮南, headquartered in modern Yangzhou, Jiangsu).

While Tutu was at Huainan, Li Yong served as military governor. It was said that while Li Yong was strict and stern, he and Tutu respected each other and did not interfere with each other. Meanwhile, in 814, with Li Jiang, who was then chancellor, repeatedly offering to resign due to a foot illness, Emperor Xianzong removed Li Jiang from his chancellor position and made him the minister of rites, with an eye toward recalling Tutu after that. He soon did so, and Tutu was again made the director of armory supplies as well as the commander of the Left Shence Army. Appreciative of the mutual respect that he had with Li Yong, in 817, he recommended Li Yong to be chancellor, and Emperor Xianzong thus recalled Li Yong to be chancellor. However, Li Yong found it shameful to be recommended by a eunuch, and upon arrival in Chang'an, he offered to resign and refused to meet his subordinates as chancellor or to carry out the duties of chancellor. Emperor Xianzong made Li Yijian chancellor instead. Meanwhile, in 818, also at Tutu's recommendation, Emperor Xianzong made Huangfu Bo a chancellor as well.

== Death ==
Meanwhile, Tutu Chengcui also injected himself into Emperor Xianzong's succession plans. Emperor Xianzong had initially, in 809, created his oldest son Li Ning, who was not born of his wife Consort Guo, crown prince, but Li Ning died in 811. After Li Ning's death, Tutu suggested that Emperor Xianzong's next oldest son, Li Kuan (李寬) the Prince of Li (whose name was later changed to Li Yun [李惲]), be created crown prince. Emperor Xianzong disagreed and created Consort Guo's son Li You the Prince of Sui (whose name was soon changed to Li Heng) crown prince instead. Despite this, Tutu continued to advocate for Li Yun's ascension, particularly after his recall. In 820, when Emperor Xianzong grew ill, it was said that Tutu was plotting to have Li Yun become emperor, such that Li Heng feared for his own safety.

In spring 820, Emperor Xianzong died suddenly—and historians generally believed that it was the eunuch Chen Hongzhi (陳弘志) who murdered him. The eunuchs Liang Shouqian (梁守謙), Ma Jintan (馬進潭), Liu Chengjie (劉承偕), Wei Yuansu (韋元素), and Wang Shoucheng, had Tutu and Li Yun killed, and they supported Li Heng to succeed to the throne (as Emperor Muzong). During the reign of Emperor Muzong's son Emperor Jingzong, the eunuch Ma Cunliang (馬存亮) submitted a petition listing the accomplishments of Tutu, and Emperor Jingzong allowed Tutu's adopted son Tutu Shiye (吐突士曄) to have Tutu Chengcui reburied properly. During the subsequent reign of another of son of Emperor Xianzong's, Emperor Xuānzong, Tutu Shiye was further promoted to be commander of the Right Shence Army (右神策軍).

== Notes and references ==
- Old Book of Tang, vol. 184.
- New Book of Tang, vol. 207.
- Zizhi Tongjian, vols. 237, 238, 239, 240, 241.
