= Wu Chongyin =

Wu Chongyin (Chinese: 烏重胤; 761 – November 30, 827), courtesy name Baojun (保君), posthumous name Duke Yimu of Bin (邠懿穆公), was a Chinese military general and politician of the Tang dynasty.

== Background ==
Wu Chongyin was born in 761, during the reign of Emperor Suzong. His ancestors were Proto-Mongolic Wuluohou (烏洛侯) tribesmen who migrated to Zhangye and shortened their surname to Wu. His father Wu Chengbi (烏承比) was an army officer at Hedong Circuit (河東, headquartered in modern Taiyuan, Shanxi). From Wu Chongyin's youth, he served as an officer at Zhaoyi Circuit (昭義, headquartered in modern Changzhi, Shanxi).

== During Emperor Xianzong's reign ==
As of 810, Wu Chongyin was serving under then-military governor (Jiedushi) of Zhaoyi, Lu Congshi (盧從史), in a campaign declared by Emperor Suzong's great-great-grandson Emperor Xianzong against the warlord Wang Chengzong the military governor of Chengde Circuit (成德, headquartered in modern Shijiazhuang, Hebei), which Lu had initially encouraged Emperor Xianzong to engage in. Once the campaign was underway, however, Lu was in secret communication with Wang and interfered with the progress of the imperial forces, commanded by the eunuch general Tutu Chengcui. After this was revealed by Lu's staff member Wang Yiyuan (王翊元) to the chancellor Pei Ji, Tutu persuaded Wu to join his plan to act against Lu. Tutu endeared himself to Lu by offering Lu a number of precious gifts; after Lu's guard was down, Tutu had Lu seized while the two were at a feast in the army camp. When Lu's soldiers were set to act against Tutu, Wu rebuked them, and they did not dare to do so, but followed Wu's orders.

Tutu put Wu temporarily in charge of the Zhaoyi forces, and Emperor Xianzong contemplated making Wu the military governor of Zhaoyi, before, at Li Jiang's advice, he shifted Wu to Heyang Circuit (河陽, headquartered in modern Jiaozuo, Henan) while making Heyang's military governor Meng Yuanyang (孟元陽) the military governor of Zhaoyi. In 814, Wu's headquarters was moved to Ru Prefecture (汝州, in modern Pingdingshan, Henan), which was added to Heyang Circuit, in anticipation of a campaign against another warlord, Wu Yuanji, who took control of Zhangyi Circuit (彰義, headquartered in modern Zhumadian, Henan) without imperial approval after the death of Wu Yuanji's father Wu Shaoyang.

Later that year, the imperial campaign against Zhangyi began in earnest, and Wu Chongyin was one of the key imperial generals against Zhangyi, frequently prevailing over Zhangyi forces in association with another imperial general, Li Guangyan the military governor of Zhongwu Circuit (忠武, headquartered in modern Xuchang, Henan), although neither was without their defeats. After Wu Yuanji was captured by another imperial general, Li Su, in 817, Wu Chongyin was given the honorary title of acting Puye (僕射), and then Sikong (司空, one of the Three Excellencies). It was said that because he rose from low ranks, he was willing to share all of the difficulties of his soldiers, and he was humble despite his accomplishments. Therefore, talented staff members were willing to serve under him. In 818, his headquarters were moved back to Huai Prefecture (懷州, in modern Luoyang, Henan).

Later in 818, with Zheng Quan (鄭權) the military governor of Henghai Circuit (橫海, headquartered in modern Cangzhou, Hebei) unable to get one of his subordinates, Li Zongshi (李宗奭) the prefect of Henghai's capital Cang Prefecture (滄州), to follow his orders, Emperor Xianzong made Wu Chongyin was made the military governor of Henghai Circuit. He was taking 3,000 Heyang soldiers with him to Henghai, but these soldiers did not wish to follow him for such distance. Soon after they left Heyang's headquarters, these soldiers deserted and considered pillaging the region; they were persuaded by the new Heyang military governor, Linghu Chu, to submit to him. As Wu was arriving at Henghai, Li's subordinates, in fear, expelled him, and Li was arrested and executed.

Once Wu took over at Henghai, he became convinced the reason why so many warlords rose north of the Yellow River and resisted imperial authorities was because of the great powers the military governors wielded. He recommended to Emperor Xianzong that the prefectural prefects be given full authority over their prefectural militias, and he started by granting the prefects in Henghai such authority. It was said that with Wu's actions, Henghai became the circuit most obedient to imperial authority north of the Yellow River thereafter.

== During Emperor Muzong's reign ==
In 820, Emperor Xianzong died and was succeeded by his son Emperor Muzong. Later that year, Wang Chengzong also died, and his brother Wang Chengyuan offered control of the circuit to the imperial government, and Emperor Muzong commissioned Tian Hongzheng to succeed Wang Chengzong. In 821, however, the Chengde officer Wang Tingcou mutinied and killed Tian, and then took over the circuit. Emperor Muzong declared a general campaign against Chengde, and Wu Chongyin was considered the leader of the imperial generals against Chengde. With Wang Tingcou's troop strength at its peak at the moment, Wu believed that he needed to wait out the situation, and therefore slowed his attack to try to wear out the Chengde troops. Emperor Muzong, displeased with Wu's slow progress, replaced Wu with Du Shuliang (杜叔良) and moved Wu to be the military governor of Shannan West Circuit (山南西道, headquartered in modern Hanzhong, Shaanxi) and the mayor of its capital Xingyuan Municipality (興元). When Wu arrived at the capital Chang'an, he further stripped Wu's military command and had him made a senior advisor to the Crown Prince. Subsequently, Wu was made the military governor of Tianping Circuit (天平, headquartered in modern Tai'an, Shandong).

== During Emperors Jingzong's and Wenzong's reigns ==
Around the new year 825, by which time Emperor Muzong's son Emperor Jingzong was emperor, Wu Chongyin, then still at Tianping, was given the honorary chancellor title of Tong Zhongshu Menxia Pingzhangshi (同中書門下平章事).

In 826, Li Quanlüe (李全略) the military governor of Henghai died. His son and deputy military governor Li Tongjie seized control of the circuit without imperial approval, and initially the imperial government did not act on his seizure of the circuit. In spring 827, by which time Emperor Jingzong's brother Emperor Wenzong was emperor, Wu was made the military governor of Henghai, and Li Tongjie was given the title of military governor of Yanhai Circuit (兗海, headquartered in modern Jining, Shandong). When Li Tongjie subsequently refused to report to Yanhai and refused to turn control of Henghai to Wu, Wu was given the additional command of Yanhai forces to attack Henghai along with other military governors around Henghai. Wu, after some initial successes, died in winter 827, while still on campaign against Li Tongjie. He was given posthumous honors, and it was said that more than 20 officers, missing him bitterly, cut off flesh from their thighs and burned them as offering to him.

== Family ==
=== Younger Brother ===
- Wu Chongyuan (烏重元)

=== Sons ===
- Wu Hanhong (烏漢弘), Zuoyulin Jiangjun(左羽林將軍), an imperial general
- Wu Xingzhuan (烏行專), prefect of Mi Prefecture
- Wu Hanzhen (烏漢貞), general of the imperial guards
- Wu Xingfang (烏行方), advisor in Henan
- Wu Hanfeng (烏漢封), advisor in Weiweisi (衛尉寺)
- Wu Hanzhang (烏漢章), Youxiaowei Cancao Canjun (右驍衛倉曹參軍), a military advisor
- Wu Xingsi (烏行思), Zuowei Cangcao Canjun(左衛倉曹參軍), a military advisor

== Notes and references ==
- Old Book of Tang, vol. 161.
- New Book of Tang, vol. 171.
- Zizhi Tongjian, vols. 238, 239, 240, 241, 242, 243.
