= Li Yong (chancellor) =

Li Yong (李鄘) (died September 14, 820), courtesy name Jianhou (建侯), was an official of the Chinese Tang dynasty, briefly commissioned as a chancellor during the reign of Emperor Xianzong — but declining the office and never actually exercising the authorities of the office.

== Background ==
It is not known when Li Yong was born, but it is known that his family was originally from Jiangxia (江夏, in modern Wuhan, Hubei). His family claimed to be descended from the Warring States period State of Zhao general Li Mu and also claimed ancestry through a line of officials of Qin dynasty, Han dynasty, and Jin dynasty (266–420). By the time of Li Yong's great-great-grandfather Li Yuanzhe (李元哲), the family had relocated to Guangling (廣陵, in modern Yangzhou, Jiangsu). Li Yong's grandfather Li Pu (李璞) served as a prefectural military officer, while his father Li Xuan (李暄) served as an imperial archiver. He had at least one older brother, Li Yun (李鄆).

Li Yong himself passed the imperial examinations during the Dali era (766-779) of Emperor Daizong, and he scored high in the class of those who were capable of rendering legal judgments. He was made Mishu Zhengzi (秘書正字), a copyeditor at the Palace Library. He was later invited by the general Li Huaiguang to serve on Li Huaiguang's staff.

== During Emperor Dezong's reign ==
After Li Huaiguang rebelled against the rule of Emperor Daizong's son Emperor Dezong in 784 and took up position at Hezhong (河中, in modern Yuncheng, Shanxi), Li Yong was concerned that his continuing to serve under Li Huaiguang would cause harm to his family, and therefore informed Li Huaiguang that his older brother was ill at the eastern capital Luoyang and that his mother wished to see his older brother. Li Huaiguang agreed, but forbid Li Yong from sending his wife and children as well. Instead, Li Yong sent his mother, wife, and children to Luoyang. When Li Huaiguang became aware of this and rebuked him, he responded, "I, Li Yong, belongs to this army and therefore cannot follow my mother to serve her, but why would you not let my wife serve her mother-in-law?" Li Huaiguang could not fault him. In 785, after Li Huaiguang's officer Lü Mingyue (呂鳴岳) was found to be secretly in communications with the imperial general Ma Sui, Li Huaiguang massacred Lü's family and further discovered that Li Yong and his colleague Gao Ying were also involved. When Li Huaiguang gathered the troops and publicly rebuked Li Yong and Gao, both of them responded that they were merely being faithful to the emperor. Li Huaiguang did not kill them, but put them under arrest. After Li Huaiguang committed suicide later in the year, and his troops surrendered to Ma, Ma released Li Yong and Gao and invited them to serve on his staff. Later, after his advice was not accepted by Ma, he left Ma's staff and retired to Luoyang. Li Gao (李皋) the Prince of Cao, who then served as the military governor (Jiedushi) of Shannan East Circuit (山南東道, headquartered in modern Xiangfan, Hubei), then invited him to serve on staff, and he did so. He was later recalled to the capital Chang'an to serve as Libu Yuanwailang (吏部員外郎), a low-level official at the ministry of civil service affairs (吏部, Libu).

In 800, after Zhang Jianfeng the military governor of Xusihao Circuit (徐泗濠, headquartered in modern Xuzhou, Jiangsu) died, the soldiers rejected the imperial orders and supported Zhang Jianfeng's son Zhang Yin (張愔) as Zhang Jianfeng's successor, killing several officers who were obeying imperial orders and putting the eunuch monitor under arrest. Zhang Yin thus claimed the title of acting military governor. Emperor Dezong sent Li Yong to Xusihao's capital Xu Prefecture (徐州) to try to comfort the troops. Li Yong persuaded the soldiers to release the eunuch monitor. Zhang Yin submitted a petition and asked Li Yong to relay it for him. Li Yong, seeing that Zhang Yin referred to himself as acting military governor, pointed out that it was not an imperially sanctioned office and told him to delete the reference, before agreeing to relay the petition for Zhang Yin. Subsequently, Emperor Dezong made Zhang Yin the military prefect (團練使, Tuanlianshi) of Xu Prefecture. After Li Yong's return to Chang'an, he was promoted to be Libu Shilang (吏部侍郎), a supervisorial official at the ministry of civil service affairs.

== During Emperor Shunzong's reign ==
After Emperor Dezong died in 805 and was succeeded by his severely ill son Emperor Shunzong, Li Yong was made deputy chief imperial censor (御史中丞, Yushi Zhongcheng). He was then made the mayor of Jingzhao Municipality (京兆, i.e., the Chang'an region) and then Shangshu You Cheng (尚書右丞), one of the secretaries general of the executive bureau of government (尚書省, Shangshu Sheng).

== During Emperor Xianzong's reign ==
Early in the Yuanhe era (805-821) of Emperor Shunzong's son Emperor Xianzong, at a time when there was much banditry at Chang'an, Li Yong was again made the mayor of Jingzhao. It was said that he made much improvement in the safety at Chang'an and became well known for it. He was soon made the military governor of Fengxiang (鳳翔) and Longyou (隴右) Circuits (both headquartered in modern Baoji, Shaanxi), as well as the mayor of Fengxiang Municipality (i.e., the capital of Fengxiang Circuit). Previously, the military governors of Fengxiang often also carried the title of commander of the Shence Army soldiers stationed at Fengxiang, and thus often went to meet the eunuch commanders of the Shence Army prior to going to Fengxiang. Li Yong found this to be inappropriate, and at his request, Emperor Xianzong did not give him the title of commander of Shence Army soldiers at Fengxiang. In 809, after the chancellor Pei Ji pointed out to Emperor Xianzong that Yan Shou (嚴綬) the military governor of Hedong Circuit (河東, headquartered in modern Taiyuan, Shanxi) was incompetent and recommended Li Yong as his replacement, Emperor Xianzong recalled Yan to Chang'an and made Li Yong the military governor of Hedong. He was later recalled to serve as the minister of justice (刑部尚書, Xingbu Shangshu), chief imperial censor (御史大夫, Yushi Daifu), and the director of the salt and iron monopolies and grain supplies. In 809, when Emperor Xianzong was set to commission the powerful eunuch Tutu Chengcui as the commander of the imperial forces against the warlord Wang Chengzong, who controlled Chengde Circuit (成德, headquartered in modern Shijiazhuang, Hebei), Li Yong, along with other officials Li Yuansu (李元素), Xu Mengrong (許孟容), Li Yijian, Meng Jian (孟簡), Lü Yuanying (呂元膺), Mu Zhi (穆質), and Dugu Yu (獨孤郁) all opposed, and Emperor Xianzong, while still putting Tutu in command, reduced Tutu's title.

In 810, Li Yong was made the military governor of Huainan Circuit (淮南, headquartered in modern Yangzhou) and the secretary general of its capital Yang Prefecture (揚州). It was said that Li Yong did not serve long at either Fengxiang or Hedong because he was stern and often changed regulations, causing the people to be unsettled. At Huainan, he was also stern, but it was said that the circuit was well-governed and wealthy. However, he was also said to be harsh in his governance, and his staff members could not stop the officers and technocrats under him from exercising the laws harshly, including carrying out many executions. His reputation thus suffered. When the imperial government waged a campaign against the warlord Wu Yuanji, who controlled Zhangyi Circuit (彰義, headquartered in modern Zhumadian, Henan), and Wu Yuanji's ally Li Shidao the military governor of Pinglu Circuit (平盧, headquartered in modern Tai'an, Shandong) dispatched troops to pressure Huainan's borders, Li Yong dispatched some 20,000 soldiers from Chu (楚州, in modern Huai'an, Jiangsu) and Shou (壽州, in modern Lu'an, Anhui) Prefectures to defend against possible actions by Wu and Li Shidao, without requesting funds from the imperial government. Further, at that time, as the imperial treasury was being depleted by the campaign against Wu, Emperor Xianzong sent the deputy director of monopolies, Cheng Yi to tour the circuits to look for additional sources of revenue. Li Yong submitted the surpluses that Huainan had, and the other circuits followed, thus relieving the imperial treasury from depletion.

Meanwhile, in 811, Tutu had been demoted and made the eunuch monitor at Huainan. It was said that he and Li Yong respected each other and did not offend each other. After Tutu was recalled to Chang'an in 814, he recommended Li Yong as chancellor. Late 817, Emperor Xianzong recalled Li Yong to be Menxia Shilang (門下侍郎), the deputy head of the examination bureau (門下省, Menxia Sheng) and chancellor de facto with the title Tong Zhongshu Menxia Pingzhangshi (同中書門下平章事). However, Li Yong did not consider himself capable to be chancellor and further felt ashamed to have been recommended by a eunuch. When the staff members played music to celebrate, Li Yong wept and stated, "I like being secure in a circuit in my old age, and a chancellorship is not properly mine." When he arrived in Chang'an around new year 818, he claimed to be ill and did not attend to the duties of chancellor. He further declined an audience with Emperor Xianzong, and when his subordinates arrived at his mansion to see him, he declined to see them. He submitted repeated offers to resign. In spring 818, Emperor Xianzong made him the minister of census (戶部尚書, Hubu Shangshu) and removed him from his chancellor position, replacing him with Li Yijian. He was subsequently made an advisor to Li Heng the Crown Prince but ordered to report to Luoyang, and soon retired.

== During Emperor Muzong's reign ==
In 820, by which time Emperor Xianzong had died and been succeeded by Li Heng (as Emperor Muzong), Li Yong died. He was given posthumous honors and the posthumous name Su (肅, "solemn"). His grandson Li Xi later served as a chancellor during the reign of Emperor Zhaozong.

== Notes and references ==
- Old Book of Tang, vol. 157.
- New Book of Tang, vol. 146.
- Zizhi Tongjian, vols. 231, 232, 235, 237, 238, 240.
