= Li clan of Zhao Commandery =

Chinese aristocratic family

The Li clan of Zhao Commandery (趙郡李氏), also known as Li clan of Zhao State (趙國李氏), is an eminent Chinese family of high-ranking government officials and Confucian scholars. The clan's ancestral home is in Zhao Commandery (趙郡), which covered parts of present-day North China.

The founder of this clan is Li Mu (李牧), military General of the State of Zhao during the Warring States period.

During the Tang dynasty, the Li clan of Zhao Commandery, the Cui clan of Boling, the Cui clan of Qinghe, the Lu clan of Fanyang, the Zheng clan of Xingyang (滎陽鄭氏), the Wang clan of Taiyuan (太原王氏) and the Li clan of Longxi (隴西李氏) were seven families who were legally banned from intermarriages.

== Branches ==
These are the branches of the Li clan of Zhao Commandery:

- Eastern ancestry (東祖)
- Western ancestry (西祖)
- Southern ancestry (南祖)

== Prominent members ==
=== Grand Chancellors of the Tang Empire ===
- Li Jiao
- Li Huaiyuan
- Li Youdao
- Li Fan
- Li Jifu
- Li Jiang
- Li Shen
- Li Deyu
- Li Jue
- Li Guyan
