= Li Fan (Tang dynasty) =

Li Fan (李藩) (754 – November 20, 811), courtesy name Shuhan (叔翰), was an official of the Chinese dynasty Tang dynasty, serving as a chancellor during the reign of Emperor Xianzong.

== Background ==
Li Fan was born in 754, during the reign of Emperor Xuanzong. His family was part of the prominent Li clan of Zhao Commandery (趙州, in modern Shijiazhuang, Hebei) — not part of the same clan as the Tang dynasty's imperial Li clan, but which is considered one of the five most prominent Han clans of Northern Wei. It traces its ancestry to the prominent Warring States period State of Zhao general Li Mu whilst the line includes officials of the Qin dynasty, the Han dynasty, Cao Wei (a country of the Three Kingdoms period), the Jin dynasty (266–420), the Former Yan or Later Yan, the Northern Wei, the Northern Qi, the Sui dynasty, and the Tang dynasty. Li Fan's great-grandfather Li Zhiyuan (李至遠) served as a deputy minister and prefect during the reign of Wu Zetian (r. 690–705), whilst his grandfather Li She (李畬) served as a supervisorial official at the Ministry of Rites during the reign of Emperor Xuanzong. Both Li Zhiyuan and Li She were known for their virtuosity.

== During Emperor Dezong's reign ==
Young and first fame

Li Fan's father Li Cheng (李承) served as a circuit governor during the reign of Emperor Xuanzong's great-grandson Emperor Dezong. Li Fan himself was said to be quiet, careful, attentive to his appearance, and studious in his youth. When Li Cheng died in 783, he left Li Fan substantial wealth. When relatives arrived to mourn Li Cheng, he allowed to take things as they wished, and thereafter continued to be charitable with the wealth; within several years, the wealth that Li Cheng left was spent, and the household was poor. When Li Fan was in his 40s, he was not yet serving as an official, and he was studying at Yang Prefecture (揚州, in modern Yangzhou, Jiangsu). He did not even have enough money for his household's use. He was much resented by his wife as a result, but he did not mind this.

When Du Ya (杜亞) served as the defender of the eastern capital Luoyang, as he had been friendly with Li Cheng, he invited Li Fan to serve as a secretary under him. While Li Fan served under Du, there was an occasion when there was a major robbery at Luoyang. False accusations were laid against Du's officer Linghu Yun (令狐運), and Du believed the accusations, tortured Linghu, and extracted a confession. Li Fan knew that Linghu was innocent and argued on his behalf; when his arguments were rejected, he resigned. When the real robber, Song Jutan (宋瞿曇), was eventually captured, Li Fan became famous.

Zhang succession crisis, consenquencies, and minor issues

Later, Zhang Jianfeng the military governor (Jiedushi) of Xusihao Circuit (徐泗濠, headquartered in modern Xuzhou, Jiangsu) invited Li to serve on his staff. In or before 800, when Zhang grew ill, one of his subordinates, Du Jian (杜兼) the prefect of one of Xusihao's prefectures, Hao Prefecture (濠州, in modern Chuzhou, Anhui), was plotting to succeed Zhang, and therefore, without Zhang's orders, arrived at Xusihao's capital Xu Prefecture (徐州). Li rebuked him and stated that if Du did not return to Hao Prefecture immediately, he would report this to the imperial government; Du, in fear, did so. When Zhang died in spring 800, the imperial government initially was set to commission Wei Xiaqing (韋夏卿) to succeed him, but the Xu Prefecture forces rebelled and supported Zhang's son Zhang Yin (張愔) as his successor. After forces commanded by Du You the military governor of Huainan Circuit (淮南, headquartered at Yang Prefecture) and Zhang Pi (張伾) the prefect of Si Prefecture (泗州, in modern Huai'an, Jiangsu) were both defeated by Xu Prefecture troops, the imperial government capitulated and allowed Zhang Yin to become military prefect (團練使, Tuanlianshi) of Xu Prefecture but took the other two prefectures and merged them into Huainan Circuit.

Thereafter, Li left Xu Prefecture and returned to Yang Prefecture. Du Jian, angry at how he felt Li took away his chance to control Xusihao, submitted an accusation to Emperor Dezong accusing Li Fan of having encouraged the rebellion of the Xu Prefecture troops. Emperor Dezong, in anger, issued an edict to Du You ordering him to execute Li. Du You, however, did not have the heart to do so. He showed the edict to Li, who indicated that he did not fear death. Du You, however, submitted a petition defending Li. Emperor Dezong, still not believing Li's faithfulness, summoned him to the capital Chang'an to meet him personally. After meeting Li, due to Li's relaxed attitude and elegance, concluded that Li was not guilty of treason, made him Mishu Lang (秘書郎), an official at the Palace Library.

At that time, the official Wang Chun (王純) was powerful, and he tried to invite Li to a meeting, intending to promote Li if Li showed submission, but Li refused to meet him. Meanwhile, Li's fellow junior officials Wang Zhongshu (王仲舒), Wei Chengji (韋成季), and Lü Dong (呂洞) were then having many associates and often met to drink. They knew of Li's reputation and invited him to join them. He joined them once but, disliking how they gamed and used frivolous language, refused to join them again. Li later became Zhuke Yuanwailang (主客員外郎), a low-level official at the ministry of rites (禮部, Lǐbu), and yet later became Yousi Yuanwailang (右司員外郎), a low-level official under one of the secretaries general at the executive bureau of government (尚書省, Shangshu Sheng).

== During Emperor Shunzong's reign ==
In 805, Emperor Dezong died and was succeeded by his son Emperor Shunzong. When Emperor Shunzong, in turn, created his son Li Chun crown prince. While Li Chun was not yet emperor, Wang Chun nevertheless changed his name to Wang Shao (王紹) to observe naming taboo, and the popular sentiment at the time believed that it was inappropriate for him to have done so — as Li Chun was not emperor. Li Fan, however, opined, "Every dynasty in history was undermined by those officials who did not understand what is important. What Wang Shao did was not unusual."

== During Emperor Xianzong's reign ==
Offices in the capital

Later in 805, Emperor Shunzong, who was severely ill, passed the throne to Li Chun (as Emperor Xianzong). Li Fan was soon made Libu Yuanwailang (吏部員外郎), a low-level official at the ministry of civil service affairs (吏部, Lìbu, note different tone than the ministry of rites), and then promoted to Libu Langzhong (吏部郎中), a supervisorial official at the ministry of civil service affairs. He was in charge of commissioning low-level officials, but on one occasion, he, after being misled by his messengers, was said to have made inappropriate commissions. He was thereafter demoted to be Zhuzuo Lang (著作郎), a supervisorial official at the archival bureau. He later was made the deputy principal of the imperial university (國子從業, Guozi Congye), and then imperial attendant (給事中, Jishizhong). As part of his duties, he reviewed drafts of imperial edicts. Whenever he saw what he believed to be improprieties in the edicts, he would write his comments on the yellow paper used for edict itself. When the officials in charge requested that, instead of doing so, he wrote on white paper and attached it to the draft edict, he responded, "Then I would be writing a petition, not correcting the edict." The chancellor Pei Ji often recommended Li as having the abilities to be a chancellor.

A frank Chancellor

In 809, as Emperor Xianzong believed that Zheng Yin was too silent to be chancellor, he removed Zheng and made Li Menxia Shilang (門下侍郎), the deputy head of the examination bureau (門下省, Menxia Sheng), and chancellor de facto with the title Tong Zhongshu Menxia Pingzhangshi (同中書門下平章事). It was said that Li was open in his talks, hiding nothing from what he knew, and was much respected by Emperor Xianzong. Later in 809, based on the recommendations of Li and Pei, Emperor Xianzong entered into a peace treaty with Tufan.

In 810, there was an occasion when Emperor Xianzong and the chancellors talked about gods and pondered whether they existed. Li, guessing that Emperor Xianzong was beginning to ponder to follow alchemists' suggestions to take various medications to seek immortality, pointed out that Qin Shi Huang and Emperor Wu of Han both failed in their efforts to achieve immortality, and that Emperor Xianzong's ancestor Emperor Taizong had fallen ill from such medicines. Li advised Emperor Xianzong to seek peace in the realm and refuse the alchemists' overtures, stating to Emperor Xianzong that he would achieve the lifespan of the mythical Emperor Yao and Emperor Shun if he did so. Li also advocated frugality.

Opposition to regional governor's pretensions

Also in 810, Wang E (王鍔) was set to be commissioned as the military governor of Hedong Circuit (河東, headquartered in modern Taiyuan, Shanxi), and wanted an honorary chancellor title, so he bribed many of Emperor Xianzong's close associates. Emperor Xianzong thus issued a secret edict to Li and fellow chancellor Quan Deyu ordering that Wang E be given the honorary chancellor title. Li drafted such an edict and then crossed out the words "and chancellor" in Wang's commission to show his opposition. Quan, who also opposed Wang's commission, was nevertheless dismayed and stated, "You can oppose it, but how is crossing out the words on the edict appropriate?" Li responded, "This is urgent. If the edict were issued, then it cannot be retracted. The sun is setting. How can we have enough time to oppose it?" After Li's and Quan's oppositions were heard by Emperor Xianzong, the matter of giving Wang the honorary chancellor title was dropped.

Fall and death in honors

Late in 810, Pei resigned on account of illness, and in spring 811, Li Jifu was made chancellor to replace Pei, over Li Fan's opposition. Li Jifu thus resented Li Fan. After he arrived at Chang'an, while meeting Emperor Xianzong, he argued that, during the time that Li Fan was chancellor and following the death of Wu Shaocheng, it was inappropriate that the warlord Wu Shaoyang was allowed to inherit the military governorship of Zhangyi Circuit (彰義, headquartered in modern Zhumadian, Henan). It was said that Li Jifu's argument caused Emperor Xianzong to be displeased, and, several days later, Li Fan was removed as chancellor and made the head of the household of Emperor Xianzong's son and crown prince, Li Ning. Several months later, Emperor Xianzong began to miss Li Fan and summoned him to have discussions with him. In 811, Li Fan was made the prefect of Hua Prefecture (華州, in modern Weinan, Shaanxi), but before he could depart Chang'an, he died and was given posthumous honors. The popular comment at the time was that he was not as capable as Pei and not as stern as Wei Guanzhi, but that he was nevertheless admired for his integrity.

== Notes and references ==
- Old Book of Tang, vol. 148.
- New Book of Tang, vol. 169.
- Zizhi Tongjian, vols. 235, 237, 238.
