= Pei Ji (Late Tang) =

Pei Ji (裴垍) (died 811), courtesy name Hongzhong (弘中), was an official of the Chinese Tang dynasty, serving as a chancellor during the reign of Emperor Xianzong.

== Background ==
It is not known when Pei Ji was born, but it is known that his family was from Jiang Prefecture (絳州, in modern Yuncheng, Shanxi). His biography in the Old Book of Tang gave no immediate ancestors' names, but indicated that he was the seventh-generation descendant of the chancellor Pei Judao, who had served during Emperor Ruizong's first reign. His biography in the New Book of Tang also gave no immediate ancestors' names, but the table of the chancellors' family trees in the New Book of Tang disavowed that he was a descendant of Pei Judao's—instead indicating that his seventh-generation ancestor had a similar name, Pei Shidao (裴師道), and listing his father as Pei Yu (裴昱) and indicating that Pei Yu was a county magistrate.

== During Emperor Dezong's reign ==
Pei Ji passed the imperial examinations when he was young. During the middle of the Zhenyuan era (785–805) of Emperor Ruizong's great-great-grandson Emperor Dezong, there was a special examination in which Emperor Dezong sought criticism of his government, and Pei received the highest score on the examination. He was thereafter made the sheriff of Meiyuan County (美原, in modern Weinan, Shaanxi). After his term of service was complete, many military governors (jiedushi) invited him to serve on staff, but he declined all of their invitations. He later served as Jiancha Yushi (監察御史), a low-level imperial censor, before being promoted to the higher censor title of Dianzhong Shiyushi (殿中侍御史); he later served as Kaogong Yuanwailang (考功員外郎), a low-level official at the ministry of rites (禮部, Libu). When then-minister of civil service affairs, Zheng Xunyu, requested that Pei be in charge of the poetry portion of the imperial examinations, it was said that Pei scored the examinations properly and did not allow powerful individuals to influence him.

== During Emperor Xianzong's reign ==
Early in the Yuanhe era (805–820) of Emperor Dezong's grandson Emperor Xianzong, Pei Ji was made Hanlin Xueshi (翰林學士), an imperial scholar. He was also made Kaogong Langzhong (考功郎中), a supervisorial official at the ministry of rites, and put in charge of drafting edicts for Emperor Xianzong. He was soon promoted to be Zhongshu Sheren (中書舍人), a mid-level official at the legislative bureau of government (中書省, Zhongshu Sheng). In 807, when the imperial scholar Li Jifu was made chancellor, he requested Pei to give him a list of junior officials who were capable, and Pei submitted some 30 names. Within a short duration, Li Jifu had those officials all promoted, and it was said at the time that Li Jifu was capable in finding them. Later in the year, after the warlord Li Qi the military governor of Zhenhai Circuit (鎮海, headquartered in modern Zhenjiang, Jiangsu) rebelled and was defeated, the officials in charge were set to confiscate Li Qi's wealth and submit it to the imperial treasury, when Pei and fellow imperial scholar Li Jiang pointed out that the wealth was the result of Li Qi's having extracted the wealth from the people of the circuit. They suggested that the wealth be used to substitute for tax revenues that would have been collected from the people of Zhenhai Circuit for that year, and Emperor Xianzong agreed.

In 808, after Emperor Xianzong declared a general pardon, the powerful eunuch Liu Guangqi (劉光琦) requested that eunuchs be sent as imperial messengers to the circuits to announce the pardon. Pei and Li Jiang opposed on the basis that often, these imperial messengers would disturb the circuits by demanding bribes. Rather, they suggested that the edict be sent out by regular expedited routine. Emperor Xianzong agreed, and refused to send the eunuchs out, over Liu's objections that precedent dictated so.

In summer 808, Emperor Xianzong held a special imperial examination for examinees to submit criticism of the government. Niu Sengru, Huangfu Shi (皇甫湜), and Li Zongmin were considered to have written criticisms that were particularly on point and were ranked the highest by the officials in charge of grading, Yang Yuling (楊於陵) and Wei Guanzhi. Initially, Emperor Xianzong was set to give commissions to Niu, Huangfu, and Li Zongmin, but Li Jifu was offended by the criticism. As Pei and fellow imperial scholar Wang Ya were the reviewers of the examination, and Huangfu was Wang's nephew, he accused Pei and Wang of conflict of interest. Due to Li Jifu's accusations, Pei and Wang were stripped of their imperial scholar status and both demoted—with Pei being made deputy minister of census (戶部侍郎). Yang and Wei were demoted out of the capital Chang'an.

However, it was said that while Emperor Xianzong felt compelled to demote Pei, he continued to trust Pei's advice, and later in the year, after Li Jifu was sent out of the capital to serve as the military governor of Huainan Circuit (淮南, headquartered in modern Yangzhou, Jiangsu), he made Pei Zhongshu Shilang (中書侍郎), the deputy head of the legislative bureau, and de facto chancellor with the title Tong Zhongshu Menxia Pingzhangshi (同中書門下平章事). He was also put in charge of editing the imperial history. Pei, who was said to be young for a chancellor, carried out several reforms:

- At that time, the taxation on the people were divided into thirds—with one third going to the imperial government, one third going to the circuit government, and one third going to the prefectural government. Further, if the people were to submit the products of labor to satisfy their taxes, the conversion formulas into cash were still the ones set early in Emperor Dezong's reign, when those goods cost less in terms of monetary value; therefore, by the time that Pei was chancellor, the burdens of the people were inappropriately high. Pei had the values of the goods reassessed, and further ordered that the circuit governors were to rely on the revenues from their capital prefecture first, before they would be permitted to take revenue from the other prefectures of the circuit. This substantially reduced the burdens on the prefectures and thus the people.
- Pei heavily discouraged the practice of powerful individuals having influence in the commissioning of officials. On one occasion, an old friend of his visited him, and he held a banquet in the friend's honor and gave the friend many gifts. The friend, at the feast, requested a position at the Jingzhao Municipality (京兆, i.e., the Chang'an region) government. Pei responded, "You, sir, do not have the abilities for that position. I cannot damage the fairness of the imperial government on account of our friendship. One day, if there were a blind chancellor who might take pity on you, he might give you the position. I cannot." Even Emperor Xianzong was hesitant to bring up personal requests with Pei as to this, and he also stopped the powerful eunuch Tutu Chengcui from doing so.
- Pei encouraged criticism of the governance and often promoted officials who submitted good criticism. On one occasion, when the officials Dugu Yu (獨孤郁), Li Zhengci (李正辭), and Yan Xiufu (嚴休復) were set to be promoted from being Shiyi (拾遺) to Bujue (補闕), they met him to thank him. Pei commented, "The Bujue Dugu and Li often submitted their best thoughts, and now they are finally being promoted. I am embarrassed that that is all they are receiving for their labor. The Bujue Yan might have had uncommon achievements, but when I was submitting your promotion, I had hesitations." This caused Yan much embarrassment.

In 809, based on Pei's recommendation, Emperor Xianzong made the imperial attendant Li Fan a chancellor as well, replacing Zheng Yin. Also in 809, after Pei pointed out that Yan Shou (嚴綬) the military governor of Hedong Circuit (河東, headquartered in modern Taiyuan, Shanxi) was not capable and that his circuit was, in effect, run by the eunuch monitor Li Fuguang (李輔光), Emperor Xianzong recalled Yan to Chang'an and replaced him with Li Yong, at Pei's recommendation.

Later in 809, the warlord Wang Shizhen the military governor of Chengde Circuit (成德, headquartered in modern Shijiazhuang, Hebei) died. His son Wang Chengzong requested to succeed his father. Emperor Xianzong, encouraged by his prior success against Li Qi and Liu Pi, considered taking control of the circuit by force. Pei opposed—pointing out that Wang would be a much more difficult target than Li Qi or Liu, particularly since Emperor Xianzong had previously allowed Li Shidao, the son of a much more defiant warlord (Li Na), to inherit Pinglu Circuit (平盧, headquartered in modern Tai'an, Shandong). Tutu, hoping to seize power from Pei, advocated military action and further requested to command the troops. Not sure what to do, Emperor Xianzong sent the deputy mayor of Jingzhao, Pei Wu (裴武), to Chengde, to meet with Wang and to observe the situation. Wang was polite to Pei Wu and offered to cede control of two of Chengde's six prefectures—De (德州, in modern Dezhou, Shandong) and Di (棣州, in modern Binzhou, Shandong)—to the imperial government. Emperor Xianzong thus agreed to commission Wang as the new military governor. However, after Pei Wu returned from Chengde, Wang reneged on his promise, and further, there were accusations that Pei Wu spent the night at Pei Ji's mansion after returning to Chang'an before meeting the emperor, against regulations. Emperor Xianzong was incensed and was ready to exile Pei Wu. Li Jiang pointed out that Pei Wu had previously not submitted to the powerful rebel general Li Huaiguang and that Pei Ji was familiar with government regulations and would not have violated them; he believed that these accusations were intended to undermine not only Pei Wu, but also Pei Ji. Emperor Xianzong thus decided not to act against Pei Wu. It was also around this time that, pursuant to the suggestions of Pei and Li Fan that a peace treaty was signed with Tufan.

Emperor Xianzong subsequently declared a campaign against Wang, with Tutu in command. However, the campaign stalled and was impaired by Lu Congshi (盧從史) the military governor of Zhaoyi Circuit (昭義, headquartered in modern Changzhi, Shanxi), who had been a major proponent of the campaign but who remained in secret contact with Wang. On an occasion when Lu sent his subordinate Wang Yiyuan (王翊元) to make reports to the chancellors, Pei secretly convinced Wang Yiyuan to join the imperial cause and to remove Lu. Subsequently, Wang and another Zhangyi officer, Wu Chongyin, secretly planned with Tutu, and Tutu was able to seize Lu and take back control of the Zhaoyi army for the imperial government.

Subsequently, with the campaign stalled and with Wang Chengzong blaming his alienation with the imperial government on Lu and offering to submit revenues to the imperial government, Emperor Xianzong exonerated Wang Chengzong and made him military governor. After Tutu returned to Chang'an, Pei pointed out that Tutu had advocated a campaign that turned out to be fruitless and should be punished. As a result, Tutu was stripped of his title as commander of the imperial Shence Army (神策軍) and made the director of munitions (軍器使, Junqishi).

Late in 810, Pei suffered a stroke. Subsequently, he resigned his chancellor position and was made the minister of defense (兵部尚書, Bingbu Shangshu). Li Jifu was recalled from Huainan to serve as chancellor. Around this time, Pei and his subordinates submitted the compiled records of Emperor Dezong's reign. Subsequently, it was said that because Li Jifu disliked Pei, Pei was further made an advisor to the crown prince Li Ning. Pei died in summer 811. Initially, no posthumous honors were granted, and only after the imperial attendant Liu Bochu (劉伯芻) submitted a petition pointing out Pei's faithfulness was Pei given posthumous honors, on 20 August.

== Notes and references ==
- Old Book of Tang, vol. 148.
- New Book of Tang, vol. 169.
- Zizhi Tongjian, vols. 237, 238.
