= Empress Dowager Zheng =

Tang Chinese empress dowager

Grand Empress Dowager of the Tang Dynasty
- Reign: 859 - 26 December 865
- Predecessor: Grand Empress Dowager Guo
- Successor: None

Empress Dowager of the Tang Dynasty
- Reign: 846 - 7 September 859
- Predecessor: Empress Dowager Jiqing
- Successor: Empress Dowager He

Dowager Consort of Guang
- Reign: 820 - 846
- Died: 26 December 865
- Spouse: Li Qi; Emperor Xianzong
- Issue: Emperor Xuānzong
Posthumous name
- Empress Xiaoming 孝明皇后

Empress Dowager Zheng (鄭太后, personal name unknown) (died December 26, 865), formally Empress Xiaoming (孝明皇后, "the filial and understanding empress"), was an empress dowager of the Chinese dynasty Tang dynasty. She was a concubine to Emperor Xianzong and, after her son Emperor Xuānzong became emperor, she became empress dowager, and, after his death, became the second and last Grand Empress Dowager of the Tang Dynasty during the reign of her grandson Emperor Yizong.

== Background ==
It is not known when the future Empress Dowager Zheng was born, and little is known about her family. According to the Old Book of Tang, at the time that that history was compiled, the old records were missing as to her family origins or how she entered the palace. However, according to the New Book of Tang, she was from Danyang (丹楊, in modern Nanjing, Jiangsu), and her surname might have been originally Erzhu (爾朱). Further according to the New Book of Tang, early in the Yuanhe era (806–820) of Emperor Xianzong, when her home region was ruled by the military governor (Jiedushi) Li Qi, a fortuneteller prophesied that she would give birth to an emperor. Hearing this, Li Qi decided to take her as a concubine. After Li Qi was defeated and executed in 807, she was confiscated and taken into the imperial palace, where she became a servant girl of Emperor Xianzong's wife Consort Guo.

== As imperial consort ==
At some point, Emperor Xianzong had sexual relations with Lady Zheng, and she gave birth to the 13th of his 20 sons, Li Yi. It was implied by the Old Book of Tang that she was then made an imperial consort with the relatively low rank of Yunü (御女).

== As consort dowager ==
Emperor Xianzong died in 820, and his son by Consort Guo, Li Heng became emperor (as Emperor Muzong). In 821, he created a number of his brothers princes, and it was at that time that Li Yi was created the Prince of Guang. Consort Zheng thus became Consort Dowager of Guang. Her activities during this time were not recorded in history, although it was said that, in 846, her younger brother Zheng Guang (鄭光) dreamed of a wagon bearing the sun and the moon, and six lighted candles uniting into one. A fortune teller informed him that this was a sign of great fortune to come.

== As empress dowager ==
Later in 846, Li Yi's nephew Emperor Wuzong (Emperor Muzong's son) was seriously ill, and the powerful eunuchs inside the palace, believing that Li Yi would be easily controlled, issued an edict in Emperor Wuzong's name creating Li Yi crown prince and renaming him to Li Chen. When Emperor Wuzong died shortly thereafter, Li Chen became emperor (as Emperor Xuānzong). He honored Consort Dowager Zheng as an empress dowager. (There were thus three empresses dowager at that time, with Emperor Muzong's mother Consort Guo then being grand empress dowager, and the mother of Emperor Wuzong's brother and predecessor Emperor Wenzong, Empress Dowager Xiao known as Empress Dowager Jiqing (as she resided at Jiqing Palace (積慶宮)), until her death in 846.) Zheng Guang, on account of his being Empress Dowager Zheng's brother, was initially made a general, and then the military governor of Pinglu Circuit (平盧, headquartered in modern Weifang, Shandong).

In 848, Grand Empress Dowager Guo died — purportedly murdered by Emperor Xuānzong. Empress Dowager Zheng had long resented Grand Empress Dowager Guo from the days when she was a servant girl under then-Consort Guo. It was said that because of this, and because Emperor Xuānzong suspected Grand Empress Dowager Guo of being complicit in Emperor Xianzong's suspicious death, Emperor Xuānzong did not accord Grand Empress Dowager Guo great respect, causing her to be distressed, almost committing suicide. On one occasion, she nearly jumped off a tower, and it was said that Emperor Xuānzong was greatly displeased and had her murdered. Emperor Xuānzong eventually wanted to allow his mother to be buried with his father Emperor Xianzong, and so initially, he would not let Grand Empress Dowager Guo be buried with Emperor Xianzong. However, after a controversy erupted, he relented.

It was said that Emperor Xuānzong served his mother in a filially pious way, and because she did not want to reside anywhere else, she remained at his Daming Palace. Also because of her, after Zheng Guang served as military governor of Pinglu, Zheng Guang was given another term as military governor of Hezhong Circuit (河中, headquartered in modern Yuncheng, Shanxi). On an occasion when Zheng Guang was at the capital Chang'an to give homage to Emperor Xuānzong, however, Emperor Xuānzong asked him for advice and was distressed to hear what he thought to be unworthy responses. He kept Zheng Guang at Chang'an, giving him a general title. Empress Dowager Zheng repeatedly told him that Zheng Guang was poor, and the emperor responded by awarding Zheng Guang great wealth, but did not again allow Zheng Guang to govern the people.

== As grand empress dowager ==
Emperor Xuānzong died in 859 and was succeeded by his son Li Cui (as Emperor Yizong). Emperor Yizong honored Empress Dowager Zheng as grand empress dowager. She died in 865. As Empress Dowager Guo was already buried with Emperor Xianzong and enshrined at his temple, she was neither; rather, she was buried near Emperor Xianzong's tomb and enshrined in a separate temple.

== Styles ==
- Lady Zheng (鄭氏/郑氏; until an unknown date)
- During the reign of Emperor Xianzong (r. 806-820)
  - Yunu (禦女/御女; from an unknown date), 8th rank consort
- During the reigns of Emperor Muzong (r. 820-824), Emperor Jingzong (r. 824-827), Emperor Wenzong (r. 827-840) and Emperor Wuzong (r. 840-846)
  - Consort Dowager of Guang (光王太妃; from 820)
- During the reign of Emperor Xuānzong (r. 846-859)
  - Empress Dowager (皇太后; from 846)
- During the reign of Emperor Yizong (r. 859-873)
  - Grand Empress Dowager (太皇太后; from 859)
  - Empress Xiaoming (孝明皇后; from 865)

== In fiction ==
Played by Mary Hon, a fictionalized version of Empress Dowager Zheng was portrayed in 2009 Hong Kong's TVB television series, Beyond the Realm of Conscience.

Portrayed by Siqin Gaowa in the 2013 film Avalokitesvara

== Notes and references ==
- Old Book of Tang, vol. 52.
- New Book of Tang, vol. 77.
- Zizhi Tongjian, vols. 248, 249, 250.
