= Li Yijian =

Li Yijian (李夷簡) (756 – October 13, 822), courtesy name Yizhi (易之), was an official of the Chinese Tang dynasty, serving as a chancellor during the reign of Emperor Xianzong.

== Background ==
Li Yijian was born in 756. He was a member of Tang dynasty's imperial Li clan, being a great-great-grandson of Li Yuanyi (李元懿) the Prince of Zheng, a son of Tang's founding emperor Emperor Gaozu. Li Yijian's grandfather Li Chayan (李察言) was not the oldest son of Li Yijian's great-grandfather Li Jing (李璥), who had inherited the title of Prince of Zheng, and therefore did not inherit the title and was not listed with any offices. Li Yijian's father Li Zixian (李自仙) served as a prefectural secretary general. Li Yijian appeared to be Li Zixian's oldest son and had at least three younger brothers, Li Yiliang (李夷亮), Li Yize (李夷則), and Li Yifan (李夷範). Because of Li Yijian's heritage, he was, at the start of his official career, made the secretary general of Zheng County (鄭縣, in modern Weinan, Shaanxi).

== During Emperor Dezong's reign ==
In 783, during the reign of Emperor Dezong, a mutiny by Jingyuan Circuit (涇原, headquartered in modern Pingliang, Gansu) at the capital Chang'an forced Emperor Dezong to flee to Fengtian (奉天, in modern Xianyang, Shaanxi). The Jingyuan soldiers supported the general Zhu Ci as their leader, and Zhu initially pretended to be calming the capital and then readying the troops to welcome Emperor Dezong back to Chang'an. He sent an emissary that was going through Hua Prefecture (華州, in modern Weinan), which Zheng County belonged to, and the official in charge of defense, Li Yi (李翼), did not dare stopping Zhu's emissary. However, Li Yijian opined that Zhu would soon turn against Emperor Dezong and pointed out that some of the Lulong Circuit (盧龍, headquartered in modern Beijing) army that previously served under Zhu had been sent to Xiangcheng (襄城, in modern Xuchang, Henan) to help defend it against the warlord Li Xilie; he believed that Zhu was summoning them to Chang'an to assist him. Li Yi thus quickly headed for Tong Pass to have Zhu's emissary searched, and indeed, an order to summon the Lulong soldiers was found. Li Yi reported this to the defender of Tong Pass, Luo Yuanguang (駱元光), who executed Zhu's emissary and submitted Zhu's order to Emperor Dezong. Emperor Dezong thus made Luo the prefect of Hua Prefecture, but as Luo took the entire credit for the incident, LI Yijian was not rewarded.

Li Yijian later left his office and submitted himself for imperial examinations, passing them in the class of those who had good judgment. He was then made the sheriff of Lantian County (藍田, in modern Xi'an, Shaanxi). He was later made an imperial censor with the title Jiancha Yushi (監察御史). At one point, he was accused of faults and exiled to be a census officer at Qian Prefecture (虔州, in modern Ganzhou, Jiangxi). (It appeared that he was later made a prefect, based on his later actions.) Nine years after his exile, he was recalled to again be imperial censor with the title Dianzhong Shiyushi (殿中侍御史).

== During Emperor Xianzong's reign ==
As of 809, during the reign of Emperor Dezong's grandson Emperor Xianzong, Li Yijian was serving as deputy chief imperial censor (御史中丞). The mayor of Jingzhao Municipality (京兆, i.e., the Chang'an region) at the time was Yang Ping (楊憑), who had previously served as the governor of Jiangxi Circuit (江西, headquartered in modern Nanchang, Jiangxi) and a superior of Li Yijian's when Li Yijian served as a prefect. Yang did not respect Li Yijian at that time, and Li Yijian, in 809, indicted Yang for corruption. Yang was thus demoted to be the sheriff of Linhe (臨賀, in modern Hezhou, Guangxi). No friend or relative of Yang's dared to send him off except Xu Hui (徐晦), and when Li Yijian heard this, believing Xu to be a faithful friend to Yang and therefore would be faithful to the state, he recommended Xu to be a Jiancha Yushi. Later in the year, when Emperor Xianzong was set to commission the powerful eunuch Tutu Chengcui as the commander of the imperial forces against the warlord Wang Chengzong, who controlled Chengde Circuit (成德, headquartered in modern Shijiazhuang, Hebei), Li Yijian was one of the officials who opposed Tutu's commission, along with Li Yuansu (李元素), Li Yong, Xu Mengrong (許孟容), Meng Jian (孟簡), Lü Yuanying (呂元膺), Mu Zhi (穆質), and Dugu Yu (獨孤郁). Emperor Xianzong thus reduced Tutu's title but still put Tutu in command. Meanwhile, Li Yijian was made deputy minister of census (戶部侍郎) and acting director of finances.

Later, Li Yijian was made the military governor (jiedushi) of Shannan East Circuit (山南東道, headquartered in modern Xiangfan, Hubei). During Emperor Dezong's reign, 500 Jiangxi soldiers had been stationed at Shannan East to help defend it against the de facto independent Zhangyi Circuit (彰義, headquartered in modern Zhumadian, Henan), and the soldiers were paid by the central government director of finances. By the time that Li was military governor, the originally stationed Jiangxi soldiers had largely died, but Shannan East was still receiving funds for them. Li Yijian found this to be inappropriate and turned down the funding for them. After three years, he was transferred to Xichuan Circuit (西川, headquartered in modern Chengdu, Sichuan) to serve as its military governor. Prior to Li's service there, Wang Yong (王顒) the prefect of Xi Prefecture (雟州, in modern Liangshan Yi Autonomous Prefecture, Sichuan) had, because of his corruption, angered the non-Han tribes of the region, who thus left the Tang-controlled areas. After Li arrived at Xichuan, he had Wang removed, and he sent letters to the non-Han chieftains pointing out that it was in their interests to be in Tang territory, and the non-Han tribes thus resubmitted. Meanwhile, the army of Sichuan had been accustomed to play two styles of music known as the Fengsheng Style (奉聖樂) and Shunsheng Style (順聖樂), created by the generals Wei Gao and Yu Di, respectively. Li, believing that it was the central government's prerogative rather than local governors' to create new styles of military music, had the music stopped.

In 818, Li Yijian was recalled to Chang'an to serve as chief imperial censor (御史大夫, Yushi Daifu). Soon thereafter, he was made Menxia Shilang (門下侍郎), the deputy head of the examination bureau of government (門下省, Menxia Sheng), as well as chancellor de facto with the title Tong Zhongshu Menxia Pingzhangshi (同中書門下平章事). As, at the time, Emperor Xianzong heavily depended on Li's chancellor colleague Pei Du in the campaigns against the warlords and Li considered himself not as capable, he requested to be assigned outside the capital. In fall 818, he was made the military governor of Huainan Circuit (淮南, headquartered in modern Yangzhou, Jiangsu), carrying the chancellor title as an honorary title.

== During Emperor Muzong's reign ==
After Emperor Xianzong died in 820 and was succeeded by his son Emperor Muzong, the officials were discussing what Emperor Xianzong's temple name should be. Li Yijian submitted a suggestion that because Emperor Xianzong had great accomplishments during his reign, he should be given a temple name that referred to him as Zu (祖) rather than Zong (宗). Other officials disagreed, however, and Emperor Xianzong's temple name was eventually fixed as Xianzong. After some time, Li Yijian requested retirement, but the central government considered Li Yijian to be still healthy, and therefore did not accept his retirement request; instead, he was recalled to serve as You Pushe (右僕射), one of the heads of the executive bureau (尚書省, Shangshu Sheng), but he declined. He was then made an advisor to the Crown Prince, but had his office at the eastern capital Luoyang. He died in 822 and was given posthumous honors.

== Notes and references ==
- New Book of Tang, vol. 131.
- Zizhi Tongjian, vols. 238, 240.
