= Emperor Xianzong of Tang =

Emperor of Tang China from 805 to 820

Emperor Xianzong of Tang 唐憲宗
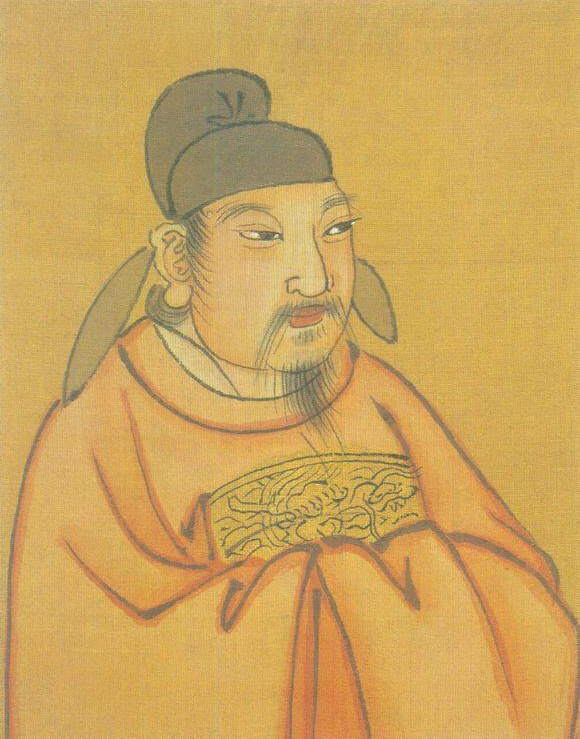
- Ming Dynasty portrait of Emperor Xianzong

Emperor of the Tang dynasty
- Reign: September 5, 805 – February 14, 820
- Predecessor: Emperor Shunzong
- Successor: Emperor Muzong
- Born: 4 March to 1 April 778
- Died: February 14, 820 (aged 41)
- Burial: Jing Mausoleum (景陵)
- Consorts: Empress Yi'an (m. 793–820); Empress Xiaoming (m. –820)
- Issue: Li Ning; Li Yun; Emperor Muzong; Li Cong; Li Xin; Li Wu; Li Ke; Li Jing; Li Yue; Li Xun; Li Yi; Li Yin; Emperor Xuanzong; Li Xie; Li Dan; Li Chong; Li Zhui; Li Ti; Li Tan; Li Ce; Princess Lianghuikang; Princess Yongjia; Princess Xuancheng; Princess Zhengwenyi; Princess Qiyang Zhuangshu; Princess Chenliu; Princess Zhenning; Princess Nankang; Princess Linzhen; Princess Zhenyuan; Princess Yongshun; Princess Anping; Princess Yong'an; Princess Ding'an
Full name
- Family name: Lǐ (李); Given name: Chún (淳), later changed to Chún (純) (changed 805)
Era name and dates
- Yúanhé (元和): January 25, 806 – February 14, 820
Posthumous name
- Emperor Zhangwu (章武皇帝) (short); Emperor Zhaowen Zhangwu; Dasheng Zhishen Xiao (昭文章武大聖至神孝皇帝) (full)
Temple name
- Xiànzōng (憲宗)
- House: Li
- Dynasty: Tang
- Father: Emperor Shunzong
- Mother: Empress Zhuangxian

Tang Xianzong
- Chinese: 唐憲宗
- Literal meaning: "Constitutional Ancestor of the Tang"
Transcriptions
Standard Mandarin
- Hanyu Pinyin: Táng Xiànzōng

Li Chun
- Chinese: 李純
- Literal meaning: (personal name)
Transcriptions
Standard Mandarin
- Hanyu Pinyin: Lǐ Chún

Emperor Xianzong of Tang (4 March to 1 April 778 – 14 February 820; r. 805 – 820), personal name Li Chun, né Li Chun (李淳), was the 14th emperor of the Chinese Tang dynasty. He was the eldest son of Emperor Shunzong, who reigned for less than a year in 805 and who yielded the throne to him late that year.

Once emperor, Emperor Xianzong set out to curb the power of the military governors (Jiedushi), and, when they would not heed his orders, he waged wars against them. His initial campaigns were quite successful, and Xianzong's army defeated warlords such as Liu Pi, Yang Huilin (楊惠琳) in 806 and Li Qi in 807. In 813, after the submission of one of the key holdouts, Weibo Circuit (魏博, headquartered in modern Handan, Hebei) under Tian Xing, Emperor Xianzong appeared poised to reunite the empire, many parts of which had effectively been ruled independently by regional warlords. Xianzong's first setback was in 813 when he failed to defeat military governor Wang Chengzong. However, by 817, after the defeat of Li Shidao and Wang's submission, all of the empire was under imperial authority again. Later historians referred to Emperor Xianzong's reign as the Yuanhe Restoration (元和中興).

Emperor Xianzong's reign briefly stabilized Tang from the destructive forces of the military governors, but saw the rise of the power of eunuchs. Emperor Xianzong himself was allegedly murdered by the eunuch Chen Hongzhi (陳弘志) in 820. (There were nagging suspicions, never proven, that Xianzong's wife Consort Guo and her son Li Heng (the later Emperor Muzong) were involved.)

== Background ==
Li Chun was born in 778, during the reign of his great-grandfather Emperor Daizong, at the Eastern Palace (i.e., the palace of his grandfather, then-Crown Prince Li Kuo). His father Li Song was Li Kuo's oldest son, and he himself was Li Song's oldest son. His mother was Li Song's concubine Consort Wang. When Li Chun was five or six, by which time Li Kuo was emperor (as Emperor Dezong), there was an occasion when Emperor Dezong held Li Chun on his lap and asked, "Who are you, such that you are in my lap?" His response of, "I am the third Son of Heaven" surprised Emperor Dezong, who thereafter showed him much favor.

== As the Prince of Guangling and Crown Prince ==
In 788, by which time Li Song (Shunzong) was crown prince, Li Chun was created the Prince of Guangling. In 793, he married Lady Guo, a daughter of the deceased general Guo Ai (郭曖) and Emperor Daizong's daughter Princess Shengping, as his wife and princess.

In 804, Li Song (Shunzong) suffered a stroke and became unable to speak. When Emperor Dezong fell gravely ill in spring 805, Li Song was unable to visit him, and Emperor Dezong, distressed over this, died soon thereafter. After Emperor Dezong's death, the eunuchs in the palace initially considered supporting another person as emperor, but due to the objections of the imperial scholars Wei Cigong (衛次公) and Zheng Yin, Li Song was able to assume the throne (as Emperor Shunzong), although during Wei and Zheng's discussion with the eunuchs, the possibility of having Li Chun take the throne directly was mentioned.

As Emperor Shunzong continued to be seriously ill and unable to speak, a group of his close associates—the eunuch Li Zhongyan (李忠言), his concubine Consort Niu, the imperial scholars Wang Shuwen and Wang Pi, and the chancellor Wei Zhiyi—became the key decision-makers. It was said that this group of individuals feared Li Chun for his intelligence and decisiveness, and initially, Li Chun was not created crown prince. However, the eunuchs Ju Wenzhen (俱文珍), Liu Guangqi (劉光琦), and Xue Yingzhen (薛盈珍), all of whom were favored by Emperor Dezong and who lost their power in the new regime, summoned the imperial scholars Zheng, Wei Cigong, Li Cheng, and Wang Ya to the palace to draft an edict for Emperor Shunzong creating Li Chun as crown prince, anyway. Zheng showed a piece of paper to Emperor Shunzong reading, "The Crown Prince should be the oldest son." Emperor Shunzong, who was unable to speak, nodded, and an edict was thereafter issued in late spring 805 creating Li Chun crown prince. The edict also changed Li Chun's name (from 淳 to 純—both rendered "Chun" in modern Mandarin). It was said that Wang Shunwen was so concerned about Li Chun that he was heard reading from Du Fu's poem about the Shu Han regent Zhuge Liang—"He had not even succeeded in his campaigns when he died. This often caused heroes to weep onto their collars." Wang Shuwen and Wei Zhiyi tried to see if their group could persuade Li Chun to favor their positions by having their associate Lu Zhi (陸質) serve as the attendant to Li Chun's studies. However, it appeared that Li Chun disliked Wang Shunwen and his associates, and whenever Lu tried to speak to him on political matters, Li Chun angrily responded, "His Imperial Majesty commissioned you, sir, to teach me about the classics. Why do you discuss other matters?"

By summer 805, a group of military governors (Jiedushi) that Wang Shuwen had disputes with—Wei Gao, Pei Jun (裴均), and Yan Shou (嚴綬)—were submitting petitions to Emperor Shunzong requesting that he let Li Chun serve as regent, and Wei Gao further submitted a petition to Li Chun as well requesting that he take power away from Wang Pi, Wang Shuwen, and Li Zhongyan. On August 26, an edict was issued in Emperor Shunzong's name for Li Chun to serve as regent. Thereafter, the imperial officials began to report to Li Chun. On August 31, Emperor Shunzong further issued an edict yielding the throne to Li Chun, taking for himself the title of "Retired Emperor" (Taishang Huang) and creating Li Chun's mother Consort Wang "Retired Empress." On September 5, Li Chun took the throne (as Emperor Xianzong).

== As Emperor ==
=== Early reign ===
Immediately after Emperor Xianzong's ascension to the throne, he purged the government of Wang Shuwen and Wang Pi's associates, exiling them. (He would later order Wang Shuwen to commit suicide.) Emperor Xianzong's father Emperor Shunzong died in spring 806. Some later historians would come to believe that Emperor Shunzong did not die of natural causes, but was murdered by the same eunuchs who had supported Emperor Xianzong's ascension.

Meanwhile, Wei Gao died late in 805, and his deputy Liu Pi seized power of Xichuan Circuit (西川, headquartered in modern Chengdu, Sichuan), which Wei had governed, rejecting the replacement that Emperor Xianzong sent, Yuan Zi. Emperor Xianzong, believing himself to lack the power to attack Liu at this point, initially made Liu the acting military governor. However, Liu then made further demands to be given two neighboring circuits—Dongchuan (東川, headquartered in modern Mianyang, Sichuan) and Shannan West (山南西道, headquartered in modern Hanzhong, Shaanxi)—as well. When Emperor Xianzong refused his demand, he launched an attack on Dongchuan's capital prefecture Zi Prefecture (梓州) in spring 806. At the suggestion of the chancellor Du Huangchang, Emperor Xianzong commissioned the general Gao Chongwen to attack Liu, assisted by the generals Li Yuanyi (李元奕) and Yan Li (嚴礪). In fall 806, Gao captured Xichuan's capital Chengdu and delivered Liu to the capital Chang'an to be executed.

Also in spring 806, Yang Huilin, the nephew of the general Han Quanyi (韓全義) the military governor of Xiasui Circuit (夏綏, headquartered in modern Yan'an, Shaanxi), seized control of the circuit after Han had been ordered to retire and resisted imperial orders. With imperial forces approaching Xiasui's capital Xia Prefecture (夏州), Yang was quickly killed by his own subordinate Zhang Chengjin (張承金), ending his rebellion. Around the same time, the warlord Li Shigu, the military governor of the powerful Pinglu Circuit (平盧, headquartered in modern Tai'an, Shandong), died, and his subordinates supported his brother Li Shidao to succeed him. Du advocated trying to divest Pinglu of some of its territory, but Emperor Xianzong, believing that with the campaign against Liu not over by that point, that he should not wage another campaign, and therefore allowed Li Shidao to inherit Pinglu.

After Liu's and Yang's destruction, another warlord, Li Qi the military governor of Zhenhai Circuit (鎮海, headquartered in modern Zhenjiang, Jiangsu) became apprehensive, and, as a means of showing loyalty, requested to go to Chang'an to pay homage to Emperor Xianzong. He did not actually intend to do so, however, and after Emperor Xianzong not only approved, but issued an edict summoning him when he did not depart Zhenhai immediately, rebelled against the imperial government. Before imperial troops could attack him, however, he was captured by his own subordinates and delivered to Chang'an to be executed. Around that time, another warlord, Yu Di the military governor of Shannan East Circuit (山南東道, headquartered in modern Xiangfan, Hubei), fearing Emperor Xianzong, went to Chang'an and yielded control of the circuit to the imperial government, after Emperor Xianzong had ensured Yu's loyalty by marrying his daughter Princess Puning to Yu's son Yu Jiyou (于季友).

In 808, an incident occurred that, as later historians opined, precipitated the later partisan struggles between the "Niu Party" and the "Li Party" that would eventually occur throughout the reigns of the five emperors after Emperor Xianzong. At a special imperial examinations where Emperor Xianzong ordered that low-level officials submit honest opinions about the government, several of the examinees—Niu Sengru, Li Zongmin, and Huangfu Shi (皇甫湜) stated, without using any veiled language, the issues they saw with the governance at the time. The officials that Emperor Xianzong put in charge of the examinations, Yang Yuling (楊於陵) and Wei Guanzhi ranked them high. However, the chancellor Li Jifu saw these as severe criticisms of himself, and, weeping, accused the reviewing officials, the imperial scholars Pei Ji and Wang Ya, of conflict of interest—as Huangfu was a nephew of Wang's. As a result of Li Jifu's accusations, Wang, Pei, Yang, and Wei were all demoted, and it was said that while no harm came to Niu, Li Zongmin, and Huangfu at that time, they were effectively stuck at the positions they previously served without promotion. As a result, they all sought positions as staff members of military governors. (Niu and Li Zongmin would later become key leaders of the "Niu Party," while Li Jifu's son Li Deyu would become a key leader of the "Li Party.")

Also around that time, the Shatuo tribes, which had long been vassals of Tang's long-term adversary Tufan, fearing that Tufan was set to move them to the interior of the Tufan state, rebelled against Tufan and surrendered to Tang, under the leadership of Zhuxie Zhiyi (朱邪執宜). They were initially settled at Shuofang Circuit (朔方, headquartered in modern Yinchuan, Ningxia) and later moved to Hedong Circuit (河東, headquartered in modern Taiyuan, Shanxi); their chieftains of the Zhuxie clan were given the area of Huanghuadui (黃花堆, in modern Shuozhou, Shanxi) as their base of operations. (The Shatuo would eventually become a major part of the Tang army, and would yet later yield the ruling families of Later Tang, Later Jin, and Later Han, after Tang's end.)

In 809, after much urging by the imperial scholars (翰林學士, Hanlin Xueshi), led by Li Jiang, that he needed to have a crown prince, Emperor Xianzong created his oldest son Li Ning, born of his concubine Consort Ji, crown prince.

Also in 809, after the death of another warlord, Wang Shizhen the military governor of Chengde Circuit (成德, headquartered in modern Shijiazhuang, Hebei), Emperor Xianzong was initially poised to let Wang Shizhen's son Wang Chengzong inherit Chengde, after Wang Chengzong offered to surrender two of his six prefectures to imperial control. However, after Wang Chengzong reneged on his promise, Emperor Xianzong commissioned the eunuch Tutu Chengcui to command the imperial troops to attack Chengde. (As a result of this campaign's launch, when another warlord, Wu Shaocheng the military governor of Zhangyi Circuit (彰義, headquartered in modern Zhumadian, Henan) subsequently died, he was unable to act against Wu Shaocheng's subordinate Wu Shaoyang, who seized control of the circuit, and was forced to commission Wu Shaoyang, much to the lament of his imperial scholar advisors, who viewed Zhangyi as a far easier target than Chengde.) The campaign against Chengde stalled, however, with one of its original major proponents, Lu Congshi (盧從史) the military governor of Zhaoyi Circuit (昭義, headquartered in modern Changzhi, Shanxi), secretly communicating with Chengde and interfering with the campaign. In summer 810, after Tutu arrested Lu at a feast and allowed the imperial general Meng Yuanyang (孟元陽) to take control of Zhaoyi, Wang agreed to formally submit to Emperor Xianzong, claiming that it was Lu who interfered in his relationship with the imperial government. Emperor Xianzong, seeing that the campaign was making no advances, ended it and made Wang the military governor of Chengde.

=== Middle reign ===
After the end of the Chengde campaign, Zhang Maozhao (張茂昭) the military governor of Chengde's neighboring Yiwu Circuit (義武, headquartered in modern Baoding, Hebei), who had inherited his position from his father Zhang Xiaozhong, offered to yield the circuit to imperial control, and Emperor Xianzong agreed, sending the official Ren Dijian (任迪簡) to replace Zhang Maozhao. (After Zhang's departure from Yiwu, however, the Yiwu soldiers mutinied against Ren and put him under house arrest, although eventually another group of soldiers then countered their mutiny and restored Ren, allowing Yiwu to be in imperial hands from this point on.) Also in the aftermaths of the Chengde campaign, Tutu Chengcui was demoted and, later, after he was involved in a corruption scandal, sent out of the capital to serve as the eunuch monitor for Huainan Circuit (淮南, headquartered in modern Yangzhou, Jiangsu).

In 811, at Li Jifu's suggestion, Emperor Xianzong appointed several officials—Duan Pingzhong (段平仲), Wei Guanzhi, Xu Mengrong (許孟容), and Li Jiang—to review the governmental structure, to streamline it, reduce the number of officials who were not carrying out any crucial tasks, and revise the officials' wage scale. Later in the year, with Emperor Xianzong believing that Li Jifu had often used his own personal likes and dislikes to decide on his policies, he promoted Li Jiang to be a chancellor as well, to counterbalance Li Jifu.

Around the new year 812, Li Ning died. In fall 812, Emperor Xianzong created another son Li You the Prince of Sui, born of his wife, Consort Guo (formerly the Princess of Guangling), crown prince and changed Li You's name to Li Heng, even though he had an older son, Li Kuan (李寬) the Prince of Li, as it was viewed by officials such as Cui Qun that Li Heng, born of a wife rather than a concubine, was the proper heir. Still, despite repeated petitions by the officials to create Consort Guo empress, Emperor Xianzong was apprehensive that, because of the prominent bloodlines that Consort Guo represented (being the granddaughter of the great general Guo Ziyi and the daughter of a princess), if she were created empress, other consorts would not dare to have sexual relations with him, and therefore repeatedly formed excuses with regard to not being able to find the right date to do so. He would eventually never create her (or any other consort) empress.

Later in 812, the warlord Tian Ji'an the military governor of Weibo Circuit died. With Tian Ji'an's son and designated successor Tian Huaijian being young, soon thereafter, the soldiers mutinied and supported Tian Ji'an's relative Tian Xing. Tian Xing offered to subject Weibo to imperial commands, and soon thereafter, Emperor Xianzong made Tian Xing the military governor of Weibo and changed his name to Tian Hongzheng. With Tian Hongzheng as Weibo's military governor, for the rest of Emperor Xianzong's reign, Weibo became obedient to the imperial government.

In 814, Wu Shaoyang died. Emperor Xianzong did not confirm Wu Shaoyang's son Wu Yuanji as his successor. In response, Wu Yuanji began attacking the nearby circuits to create pressure on the imperial government. Emperor Xianzong declared a general campaign against Wu Yuanji. Wu sought aid from Li Shidao and Wang Chengzong, who repeatedly petitioned Emperor Xianzong to pardon Wu Yuanji, to no avail. Li Shidao thereafter retained a group of assassins to carry out guerilla warfare tactics around the eastern capital Luoyang, to try to disrupt the campaign against Zhangyi and to create a sense of terror among the officials and the people. When the imperial pressure on Zhangyi still being unrelenting, with the imperial generals Wu Chongyin and Li Guangyan frequently dealing Zhangyi troops defeats (although imperial troops were unable to decisively defeat Zhangyi), Li Shidao decided to assassinate the chancellor Wu Yuanheng, whom Emperor Xianzong had put in charge of the campaign against Zhangyi, as well as the official Pei Du, a major proponent of the campaign. In summer 814, assassins that Li Shidao sent killed Wu Yuanheng and wounded Pei, terrifying the officials and the people at Chang'an. Emperor Xianzong's resolve against Zhangyi did not change, however, and when he came to believe that Wang was responsible for the assassination, he declared a general campaign against Wang as well. He also promoted Pei to be a chancellor. (Later, after investigations by Lü Yuanying (呂元膺) the defender of Luoyang after a plot by Li Shidao's subordinates to riot at Luoyang was foiled, Emperor Xianzong found out that Li Shidao was responsible for Wu Yuanheng's assassination, but by that point, as he was already waging campaigns against Wu Yuanji and Wang, he could not, and did not, declare yet another campaign against Li Shidao as well at that point.)

=== Late reign ===
The imperial forces sent against Zhangyi and Chengde were unsuccessful in quickly achieving final victory against them, however. In 817, with suggestion from the chancellor Li Fengji that he should concentrate on one campaign, Emperor Xianzong called off the campaign against Chengde (although he did not pardon Wang). Meanwhile, Pei Du volunteered to head to the Zhangyi front to oversee the operation, and Emperor Xianzong agreed. Later in the year, Li Su the military governor of Tangsuideng Circuit (唐隨鄧, headquartered in modern Zhumadian) launched a surprise attack against Zhangyi's capital Cai Prefecture (蔡州), catching its defenders off guard and capturing it, seizing Wu Yuanji. Wu was subsequently delivered to Chang'an to be executed, and the imperial troops under Pei took over Zhangyi.

After Wu Yuanji's execution, Li Shidao and Wang Chengzong both became fearful. In 818, Wang offered to surrender two prefectures to imperial control and send his two sons to Chang'an to serve as hostages. He also sought intercession from Tian Hongzheng. With Tian also requesting that Emperor Xianzong accept his offer, Emperor Xianzong did so, merging the two prefectures that Wang surrendered into neighboring Henghai Circuit (橫海, headquartered in modern Cangzhou, Hebei), which had been obedient to the imperial government. Li Shidao also offered to surrender three of his 12 prefectures to imperial control and send his son as a hostage—but soon reneged on the offer. Emperor Xianzong thus declared a general campaign against his Pinglu Circuit, and soon, the imperial forces were repeatedly dealing defeats to Pinglu troops.

Meanwhile, it was said that after the victory over Zhangyi, Emperor Xianzong began to be arrogant and extravagant in his lifestyle, and he favored such officials as Huangfu Bo and Cheng Yi, whom he believed to be capable of increasing revenues for palace use. He eventually made both Huangfu and Cheng chancellors, despite earnest pleas by Pei and Cui Qun, who was a chancellor by this point as well, against the move. It was said that Huangfu soon was speaking against Cui and Pei, causing both to be sent out of the capital. In spring 819, there was an occasion when Emperor Xianzong had what was alleged to be Gautama Buddha's finger bone escorted from a temple in Fengxiang (鳳翔, in modern Baoji, Shaanxi) to the palace in a grand ceremony, kept the bone in the palace for three days, and encouraged the people to worship it and make donations to the temples. When the official Han Yu spoke against it, Han was exiled to be the prefect of Chao Prefecture (潮州, in modern Chaozhou, Guangdong).

Also in spring 819, after Li Shidao became suspicious of his officer Liu Wu, who was then resisting Tian's attack, and secretly ordered Liu's deputy Zhang Xian (張暹) to execute Liu and take over the troops. Zhang, who was friendly with Liu, revealed Li Shidao's orders to Liu. Liu responded by launching a surprise attack on Pinglu's capital Yun Prefecture (鄆州), capturing Li Shidao and his sons and executing them, delivering their heads to Chang'an. Emperor Xianzong made Liu, who had expected to succeed Li Shidao, the military governor of Yicheng Circuit (義成, headquartered in modern Anyang, Henan), and divided Pinglu into three circuits to weaken it and keep its territory under imperial control.

By this point, Emperor Xianzong was taking medicines made by the alchemist Liu Mi (柳泌), who claimed that he could bring the emperor immortality. It was said that as a result of these medicines, Emperor Xianzong was becoming increasingly thirsty and irritable. It was said that he was so easily angered that the eunuchs serving him were often punished or even executed for minor faults, causing them to be fearful of him. In spring 820, he died suddenly, and it was commonly believed that he was assassinated by the eunuch Chen Hongzhi. It was said, however, that Chen's eunuch colleagues declared that Emperor Xianzong had died from Chinese alchemical elixir poisoning due to the medicines that he was taking. Tutu Chengcui tried to support Li Kuan, who had been renamed Li Yun (李惲), to succeed Emperor Xianzong, but the other eunuchs Liang Shouqian (梁守謙), Ma Jintan (馬進潭), Liu Chengjie (劉承偕), Wei Yuansu (韋元素), and Wang Shoucheng, supported Li Heng, and they killed Tutu and Li Yun. Li Heng thereafter became emperor (as Emperor Muzong). (Another son of Emperor Xianzong's, Li Yi, after he became emperor in 846, would come to suspect that Consort Guo and Li Heng were involved in Emperor Xianzong's assassination, but no direct evidence tied them to the assassination.)

== Chancellors during reign ==
- Du You (805–812)
- Jia Dan (805)
- Wei Zhiyi (805)
- Du Huangchang (805–807)
- Yuan Zi (805)
- Zheng Yuqing (805–806)
- Zheng Yin (805–809)
- Wu Yuanheng (807, 813–815)
- Li Jifu (807–808, 811–814)
- Yu Di (808–813)
- Pei Ji (808–810)
- Li Fan (809–811)
- Quan Deyu (810–813)
- Li Jiang (811–814)
- Zhang Hongjing (814–816)
- Wei Guanzhi (814–816)
- Pei Du (815–819)
- Li Fengji (816–817)
- Wang Ya (816–818)
- Cui Qun (817–819)
- Li Yong (817–818)
- Li Yijian (818)
- Huangfu Bo (818–820)
- Cheng Yi (818–819)
- Linghu Chu (819–820)
- Han Hong (819–820)

== Family ==
- Empress Yi'an, of the Guo clan of Huayin (懿安皇后 華陰郭氏/懿安皇后 华阴郭氏; d. 851), first cousin once removed, personal name Nianyun (念雲/念云)
  - Li Heng, Muzong (穆宗 李恆; 795–824), third son
  - Princess Qiyang Zhuangshu (岐陽莊淑公主/岐阳庄淑公主; d. 837), 11th daughter
    - Married Du Cong of Jingzhao, Duke Bin (京兆; 794–873) in 814, and had issue (two sons, two daughters)
  - Li Wu, Prince Jiang (絳王 李悟/绛王 李悟; 797–827), sixth son
- Empress Xiaoming, of the Zheng clan (孝明皇后 鄭氏; d. 865)
  - Li Chen, Xuanzong (宣宗 李忱; 810–859), 13th son
  - Princess Anping (安平公主)
    - Married Liu Yi (劉異/刘異)
- Able Consort, of the Wang clan (王贤妃)
- Taiyi, of the Xu clan (太儀 許氏/太仪 许氏)
  - Princess Nankang (南康公主)
    - Married Shen Fen (沈汾)
- Taiyi, of the Yang clan (太仪 杨氏)
  - Li Yue, Prince Qiong (瓊王 李悅/琼王 李悦; d. 840), ninth son
- Meiren, of the Ji clan (美人 纪氏)
  - Li Ning, Crown Prince Huizhao (惠昭皇太子 李寧/惠昭皇太子 李宁; 793–812), first son
- Lady, of the Du clan (杜氏)
  - Li Xun, Prince Mian (沔王 李恂; 808–844), tenth son
- Lady, of the Zhao clan (赵氏)
  - Li Yin, Prince Mao (茂王 李愔; 809–853), 12th son
- Lady, of Zheng clan (郑氏)
  - Princess Zhengwenyi (鄭溫儀公主/郑温仪公主)
    - Married Wei Rang (韋讓/韦让) in 816, and had issue (four sons, three daughters)
- Unknown
  - Li Yun, Prince Li (澧王 李惲/澧王 李恽; d. 820), second son
  - Li Cong, Prince Shen (深王 李悰), fourth son
  - Li Xin, Prince Yang (洋王 李忻; 801–828), fifth son
  - Li Ke, Prince Jian (建王 李恪; 805–821), seventh son
  - Li Jing, Prince Fu (鄜王 李憬; d. 839), eighth son
  - Li Yi, Prince Wu (婺王 李懌/婺王 李译), 11th son
  - Li Xie, Prince Zi (淄王 李恊/淄王 李协; d. 836), 14th son
  - Li Dan, Prince Heng (衡王 李憺), 15th son
  - Li Chong, Prince Chan (澶王 李㤝), 16th son
  - Li Zhui, Prince Di (棣王 李惴), 17th son
  - Li Ti, Prince Peng (彭王 李惕), 18th son
  - Li Tan, Prince Xin (信王 李憻; d. 867), 19th son
  - Li Ce, Prince Rong (榮王 李㥽/荣王 李㥽; 815–880), 20th son
  - Princess Lianghuikang (梁惠康公主), first daughter
    - Married Yu Jiyou of Henan (河南 於季友/河南 于季友), the fourth son of Yu Di, in 807
  - Princess Yongjia (永嘉公主)
  - Princess Hengyang (衡陽公主/衡阳公主)
  - Princess Xuancheng (宣城公主), sixth daughter
    - Married Shen Chai (沈𥐟)
  - Princess Chenliu (陳留公主/陈留公主)
    - Married Pei Sun of Hedong (河東 裴損/河东 裴损)
  - Princess Zhenning (真寧公主/真宁公主), second daughter
    - Married Xue Hong of Hedong (河東 薛翃/河东 薛翃) in 806
  - Princess Linzhen (臨真公主/临真公主)
    - Married Wei Zhu (衛洙/卫洙)
  - Princess Pukang (普康公主)
  - Princess Zhenyuan (真源公主)
    - Married Du Zhongli (杜中立)
  - Princess Yongshun (永順公主/永顺公主)
    - Married Liu Hongjing (劉弘景/刘弘景)
  - Princess Yong'an (永安公主), ninth daughter
  - Princess Yining (義寧公主/义宁公主)
  - Princess Ding'an/Princess Taihe (定安公主/太和公主), tenth daughter
    - Married Chongde Qaghan (崇德可汗; d. 824) of the Uyghur Khaganate in 821
  - Princess Gui (貴公主/贵公主)

Regnal titles
Preceded by Emperor Shunzong of Tang	Emperor of the Tang dynasty 805–820	Succeeded by Emperor Muzong of Tang
