= Li Jiang (born 764) =

Li Jiang (Chinese: 李絳; 764 – March 8, 830), courtesy name Shenzhi (深之), posthumous name Duke Zhen of Zhao Commandery (趙郡貞公), was a Chinese politician of the Tang dynasty, serving as a chancellor during the reign of Emperor Xianzong.

== Background ==
Li Jiang was born in 764, during the reign of Emperor Daizong. His family was part of the prominent Li clan of Zhao Prefecture (趙州, in modern Shijiazhuang, Hebei)—not part of the same clan as Tang dynasty's imperial Li clan, but which had been considered one of the five most prominent Han clans of Northern Wei. It traced its ancestry to the prominent Warring States period state Zhao general Li Mu, and the line included officials of the Qin dynasty, the Han dynasty, the state of Cao Wei, the Jin dynasty (266–420), the Northern Wei, the Sui dynasty, and the Tang dynasty His grandfather Li Gang (李岡) served as a county magistrate, while his father Li Yuanshan (李元善) served as a prefectural official.

After Li Jiang passed the imperial examinations, including a special examination in grand speech, he was made Xiaoshu Lang (校書郎), a copyeditor at the archival bureau, and later served as the sheriff of Weinan County (渭南, in modern Weinan, Shaanxi). Late in the Zhenyuan era (785–805) of Emperor Daizong's son Emperor Dezong, Li Jiang became an imperial censor with the title Jiancha Yushi (監察御史).

== During Emperor Xianzong's reign ==
=== Prior to chancellorship ===
In 807, during the reign of Emperor Dezong's grandson Emperor Xianzong, Li Jiang was made Hanlin Xueshi (翰林學士), an imperial scholar. Later that year, after the rebellion of the warlord Li Qi the military governor (jiedushi) of Zhenhai Circuit (鎮海, headquartered in modern Zhenjiang, Jiangsu) was suppressed, the officials in charge confiscated Li Qi's wealth. At the suggestion of Li Jiang and fellow imperial scholar Pei Ji, Emperor Xianzong agreed to have Li Qi's wealth deemed to substitute for the taxes that the people of Zhenhai would have submitted that year (as Li Jiang and Pei reasoned that Li Qi extracted the wealth from the people). Later that year, when Emperor Xianzong discussed with Li Jiang an accusation by the chancellor Li Jifu that another chancellor, Zheng Yin, was in secret communications with the warlord Lu Congshi (盧從史), the military governor of Zhaoyi Circuit (昭義, headquartered in modern Changzhi, Shanxi), Li Jiang pointed out that Zheng had a reputation for faithfulness and would not be conspiring with a warlord. As a result, Emperor Xianzong took no actions against Zheng. Yet later that year, when Emperor Xianzong was set to marry his daughter Princess Puning to Yu Jiyou (于季友), the son of another warlord, Yu Di, the military governor of Shannan East Circuit (山南東道, headquartered in modern Xiangfan, Hubei), Li Jiang opposed, pointing out that Yu Di was of Xianbei extraction, and Yu Jiyou was not even born of Yu Di's wife—but Emperor Xianzong overruled him, as he used the marriage to bring Yu Di into the imperial fold.

In 808, at Li Jiang's and Pei's suggestion, Emperor Xianzong, when declaring a general pardon, did not send eunuchs out to the circuits as messengers, to avoid the eunuchs demanding bribes and disturbing the circuits. In 809, during a drought, Li Jiang and fellow imperial scholar Bai Juyi made several recommendations—decreasing taxes, decreasing the number of ladies in waiting, disallowing regional governors from submitting tributes (so that they would not extract wealth from the people), and the banning of slave-capture in the southern regions of the realm. Emperor Xianzong accepted their suggestions. In 809, at the suggestion of Li Jiang and his fellow imperial scholars that Emperor Xianzong should have a crown prince, Emperor Xianzong created his oldest son Li Ning crown prince. Later that year, when the military governor Pei Jun (裴均) submitted a tribute of silver vessels despite the regulations banning the tributes, Li Jiang and Bai pointed out to Emperor Xianzong that if his edicts were to be taken seriously, he needed to decline the tribute; Emperor Xianzong thus transferred the silver vessels to the bureau of finances, but thereafter ordered the circuits not to inform the imperial censors on tributes, despite Bai's objections. Meanwhile, as Wang Shizhen the military governor of Chengde (成德, headquartered in modern Shijiazhuang, Hebei), had just recently died, Emperor Xianzong considered using the opportunity to seize control of Chengde (which had been ruled in a de facto independence from the imperial government), rather than allowing Wang's son Wang Chengzong to inherit the circuit. Li Jiang and the other imperial scholars opposed, pointing out that Chengde would be more difficult of a target than Zhangyi Circuit (彰義, headquartered in modern Zhumadian, Henan), then ruled by Wu Shaoyang. However, Emperor Xianzong, persuaded by the powerful eunuch Tutu Chengcui, prepared for a campaign against Chengde anyway. Meanwhile, later that year, after Tutu headed a project to rebuild Anguo Temple (安國寺) and built a grand monument, intending to use it to praise Emperor Xianzong, Li Jiang pointed out that in history, the truly great rulers did not establish monuments for themselves. Emperor Xianzong thus ordered the monument destroyed.

Late in 809, Emperor Xianzong resolved to allow Wang Chengzong to inherit the circuit, after Wang informed the imperial official sent to visit him, Pei Wu (裴武), that he would submit two of Chengde's six prefectures to imperial control. When Wang subsequently reneged on the promise, Emperor Xianzong ordered a campaign against Wang and was set to punish Pei Wu, but Li Jiang pointed out that it was not Pei Wu's fault that Wang reneged and further pointed out that the accusations against Pei Wu appeared to be intending to harm Pei Ji (who had by then become a chancellor) as well. Emperor Xianzong agreed and took no actions against Pei Wu. It was said that Li Jiang often pointed out to Emperor Xianzong that the eunuchs were interfering with governance. In 810, when eunuchs injured the official Yuan Zhen (元稹) in a confrontation, Emperor Xianzong demoted Yuan despite the objections of Li Jiang and fellow imperial scholar Cui Qun. Later in 810, after Tutu, working with Lu's subordinate Wu Chongyin, arrested Lu at a feast that Tutu held for Lu, Emperor Xianzong, at Li Jiang's recommendation, transferred Meng Yuanyang (孟元陽) the military governor of Heyang Circuit (河陽, headquartered in modern Jiaozuo, Henan) to Zhaoyi and made Wu the military governor of Heyang, rather than directly giving Zhaoyi to Wu, under the rationale that if Wu were given Zhaoyi, effectively, the imperial government had not regained authority over Zhaoyi. After the campaign against Chengde, which Tutu commanded and which Lu encouraged, thereafter ended later that year, it was at Li Jiang's insistence that Emperor Xianzong demoted Tutu. However, when Li Jiang continued to criticize Tutu for interfering in political matters, Emperor Xianzong became angry on one occasion. When Li Jiang, weeping, pointed out that it was his responsibility to do try to report honest advice to the emperor, Emperor Xianzong's anger dissipated and praised Li Jiang for his faithfulness, and he made Li Jiang Zhongshu Sheren (中書舍人), a mid-level official at the legislative bureau of government (中書省, Zhongshu Sheng). During these years that Li Jiang served as imperial scholar, he was promoted in his titles several times, but remained imperial scholar, and it was said that he was earnest in his responsibilities as correcting the emperor.

In 811, it was said that because the eunuchs disliked having Li Jiang at the Hanlin Institute (where the imperial scholars resided), Li Jiang was made the deputy minister of census (戶部侍郎, Hubu Shilang). On one occasion, when Emperor Xianzong asked him why he was not submitting surpluses to the imperial treasury like prior deputy ministers of census, he pointed out that there should not be such a thing as surpluses—that any property that the ministry of census was in charge of was governmental property in any case. Emperor Xianzong approved of his honesty. In summer of that year, at Li Jifu's suggestion, Emperor Xianzong commissioned Li Jiang, along with Duan Pingzhong (段平仲), Wei Guanzhi, and Xu Mengrong (許孟容), to revise the salary scales of imperial officials.

=== As chancellor ===
In winter 811, Emperor Xianzong made Li Jiang Zhongshu Shilang (中書侍郎), the deputy head of the legislative bureau, and de facto chancellor with the title Tong Zhongshu Menxia Pingzhangshi (同中書門下平章事), because he had heard that Li Jifu, as chancellor, often based his decisions on his personal likes and dislikes. It was said that Li Jifu was often flattering the emperor, while Li Jiang was direct in his opinions, and the two therefore often argued before Emperor Xianzong. Emperor Xianzong often agreed with Li Jiang, causing a rift between Li Jiang and Li Jifu. In 812, when Li Jiang sent the mayor of Jingzhao Municipality (京兆, i.e., the region of the Tang capital Chang'an), Yuan Yifang (元義方), whom Li Jifu had promoted, out of Chang'an to serve as the governor (觀察使, Guanchashi) of Fufang Circuit (鄜坊, headquartered in modern Yan'an, Shaanxi) because he despised Yuan for having flattered Tutu Chengcui, Yuan accused Li Jiang of favoring the deputy mayor Xu Jitong (許季同), who had passed the imperial examinations in the same year that Li Jiang did. Emperor Xianzong was skeptical of Yuan's accusations, and subsequently, when Li Jiang stated that he had no particular reason to favor those who passed the imperial examinations in the same year, Emperor Xianzong sent Yuan on his way.

Also in 812, Tian Ji'an the military governor of Weibo Circuit (魏博, headquartered in modern Handan, Hebei), which had also had de facto independence from the imperial government, died. Li Jifu advocated preparing for a campaign against Weibo to seize it, while Li Jiang believed that soon there would be an uprising from a Weibo officer to seize control of Weibo from Tian Ji'an's young son Tian Huaijian and thus believed that preparing for a campaign was unnecessary. Emperor Xianzong agreed with Li Jiang. Soon thereafter, the Weibo officer Tian Xing seized control of Weibo from Tian Huaijian and submitted to the imperial government. At Li Jiang's suggestion, Emperor Xianzong immediately named Tian Xing military governor, rather than just acting military governor, and awarded a large amount of monetary rewards to the Weibo soldiers. Tian Xing thereafter became a key general in various imperial campaigns against warlords. Also at Li Jiang's suggestion, Emperor Xianzong commissioned a project to put fields in the border Zhenwu (振武, headquartered in modern Hohhot, Inner Mongolia) and Tiande (天德, headquartered in modern Bayan Nur, Inner Mongolia) Circuits to use. It was said that after some four years, a large amount of fields were created, greatly reducing the expenses of shipping food to the border defense troops. After a Tufan attack on the western border, Li Jiang also advocated that the command of imperial Shence Army soldiers, sent to the western borders to support the local troops, be given to the local commanders, rather than having the eunuchs in command of Shence Army maintain control. Emperor Xianzong initially agreed with Li Jiang, but due to the eunuchs' opposition did not actually carry out the plan.

In 813, with Li Jifu and Li Jiang continuing to often argue and fellow chancellor Quan Deyu not taking sides, Emperor Xianzong lost respect for Quan and stripped Quan of his chancellor position. Meanwhile, in fall 813, when Li Guangjin (李光進) the military governor of Zhenwu requested permission to reconstruct the walls of the Eastern Surrender Fort (東受降城, in modern Hohhot), which had been destroyed by a Yellow River flood in 812, Emperor Xianzong, at Li Jifu's suggestion, instead sent the soldiers originally stationed at the Eastern Surrender Fort to Tiande Circuit, despite the objections of Li Jiang and Lu Tan (盧坦) that the Eastern Surrender Fort was a strategically important spot that the Tang armies should continue to station. However, Li Jiang also used the opportunity to report to Emperor Xianzong the serious issue that the border armies actually lacked soldiers despite their apparent grand numbers—such that while 400 soldiers were supposed to be transferred to Tiande from the Eastern Surrender Fort, only 50 soldiers actually went (because although a 400-strong force existed on paper, there were actually only 50 soldiers there). Emperor Xianzong ordered a review of the border defense rolls, but it was said that because Li Jiang soon thereafter left the chancellorship, the review was never carried out.

Also in 813, Li Jiang was created the Baron of Gaoyi. He soon offered to resign his chancellorship due to a foot ailment. In 814, Emperor Xianzong accepted the resignation and made him the minister of rites (禮部尚書, Lǐbu Shangshu). (However, it was also said that Emperor Xianzong, in doing so, was keenly aware of the long-running feud between Li Jiang and Tutu Chengcui. He had demoted Tutu out of the capital before making Li Jiang chancellor, and it was said that he demoted Li Jiang in order to recall Tutu to the capital, and Tutu was indeed soon thereafter recalled.)

=== After chancellorship ===
After Li Jiang's removal from chancellorship, he continued to give Emperor Xianzong advice. For example, soon thereafter, he suggested that the Uyghur proposal of having a Tang princess marry the Baoyi Khan, which Emperor Xianzong had declined previously due to the expenses involved, should be accepted, to further affirm the alliance between Tang and the Uyghur khanate. His suggestion, however, was not accepted. In 815, he was sent out of the capital to serve as the prefect of Hua Prefecture (華州, in modern Weinan), but soon recalled to serve as the minister of defense (兵部尚書, Bingbu Shangshu). He later, when his mother died, left governmental service to observe a mourning period for her. In 819, he returned to government service and was made the governor of Hezhong Circuit (河中, headquartered in modern Yuncheng, Shanxi), which typically was governed by a military governor, but as the chancellor in power at the time, Huangfu Bo, disliked Li Jiang, Li Jiang was only given a governor title.

== During Emperor Muzong's reign ==
In 820, after Emperor Xianzong died and was succeeded by his son Emperor Muzong, Huangfu Bo was exiled, and Li Jiang was recalled to again serve as minister of defense. He was soon made the chief imperial censor (御史大夫, Yushi Daifu). As Emperor Muzong was often spending time on tours and games, Li Jiang tried to correct his behavior, but Emperor Muzong would not follow his advice. He therefore offered to resign, but was instead again made the minister of defense. In 821, he was made the minister of civil service affairs (吏部尚書, Lìbu Shangshu, note different tone than the minister of rites). Later in the year, he was made the defender of the eastern capital Luoyang. In 822, he was made the military governor of Yanhai Circuit (兗海, headquartered in modern Jining, Shandong). In 823, he was again made the defender of Luoyang. In 824, he was given the title of acting Sikong (司空, one of the Three Excellencies). Around this time, he also served for some time as the military governor of Dongchuan Circuit (東川, headquartered in modern Mianyang, Sichuan).

== During Emperor Jingzong's reign ==
Early in the Baoli era (824–826) of Emperor Muzong's son Emperor Jingzong, Li Jiang was recalled to serve as Zuo Pushe (左僕射), one of the heads of the executive bureau (尚書省, Shangshu Sheng). In 825, when Liu Wu the military governor of Zhaoyi died and left a request to let his son Liu Congjian inherit the circuit, Li Jiang opposed, believing that the imperial government should send a replacement for Liu Wu quickly, and that if that occurred, Liu Congjian would not dare to resist. However, it was said that because the chancellor in power at the time, Li Fengji, and the powerful eunuch Wang Shoucheng, had both received bribes from Liu Congjian, they allowed Liu Congjian to inherit the circuit regardless. It was said that Li Jiang despised wicked individuals without compromise, and there was an incident in which, on the street, the deputy chief imperial censor Wang Bo (王播), despite being less senior in rank, refused to yield to him, leading to Li Jiang initiating a debate on whether the deputy chief imperial censor needed to yield to a Pushe. Li Fengji disliked Li Jiang, and therefore had Li Jiang made Taizi Shaoshi (太子少師), an advisor to the Crown Prince, and had Li Jiang's office transferred to Luoyang.

== During Emperor Wenzong's reign ==
After Emperor Jingzong died in 826 and was succeeded by his brother Emperor Wenzong, Li Jiang was recalled to serve as the minister of worship (太常卿, Taichang Qing). In 828, he was made the military governor of Shannan West Circuit (山南西道, headquartered in modern Hanzhong, Shaanxi) and the mayor of its capital Xingyuan Municipality (興元), and he was created the Duke of Zhao Commandery. After Nanzhao forces made a major attack on Chengdu, the capital of the neighboring Xichuan Circuit (西川, headquartered in modern Chengdu) in winter 829, Li Jiang was ordered to reinforce Xichuan forces, Li Jiang retained some 1,000 soldiers and was ready to send them to Xichuan. However, before the soldiers could head to Xichuan, the Nanzhao forces withdrew. As Shannan West had a set quota of soldiers, Li Jiang could not retain these soldiers, so in spring 830, after distributing wheat to them, he decommissioned them. When the soldiers went to bid farewell to the eunuch monitor of the army, Yang Shuyuan (楊叔元), Yang, who had long resented Li Jiang for not respecting him, wanted to incite a mutiny against Li Jiang, and therefore aroused their anger by pointing out how little they received. These soldiers, thus incited, attacked Li Jiang's headquarters. Li Jiang, who did not expect this to happen, could not defend against the attack, but when his staff members suggested that he flee the city, he refused, pointing out that as the commander of the region, he could not abandon it. The soldiers killed him and his staff and further slaughtered his household. Yang submitted a false report accusing Li Jiang of having caused the mutiny by embezzling the salary of the soldiers. The imperial officials defended Li Jiang, and Kong Minxing (孔敏行) submitted a report on how Yang incited the mutiny. When the new military governor, Wen Zao (溫造), arrived at Shannan West, he led these mutineers into a trap by holding a feast for them, and then slaughtering them, offering their heads to Li Jiang and the staff members as sacrifices. Yang was spared but exiled. Emperor Wenzong awarded Li Jiang posthumous honors.

== Notes and references ==
- Old Book of Tang, vol. 164.
- New Book of Tang, vol. 152.
- Zizhi Tongjian, vols. 237, 238, 239, 244.
