= Li Qi (military governor) =

- Traditional Chinese: 李錡
- Simplified Chinese: 李锜
Transcriptions
Standard Mandarin
- Hanyu Pinyin: Lǐ Qí
- Wade–Giles: Li^{3} Chʻi^{2}
- IPA: [lì tɕʰǐ]
Middle Chinese
- Middle Chinese: /lɨ^{X} ɡˠiᴇ/

Li Qi (李錡; 741 – December 3, 807) was a military governor (Jiedushi) of the Chinese Tang dynasty, governing Zhenhai Circuit (鎮海, headquartered in modern Zhenjiang, Jiangsu). In 807, he rebelled against the authority of Emperor Xianzong, but he was quickly defeated and captured by his own subordinates who turned against him, and he was delivered to the capital Chang'an and executed via waist chop.

== Background and service during Emperor Dezong's reign ==
Li Qi was born in 741, during the reign of Emperor Xuanzong. His father Li Ruoyou (李若幽), who was later renamed Li Guozhen (李國貞) by Emperor Xuanzong's son Emperor Suzong, was a member of Tang dynasty's imperial Li clan — his fifth-generation ancestor was one of the contributors to Tang's establishment, Li Shentong (李神通) the Prince of Huai'an, a cousin of Tang's founding emperor Emperor Gaozu. During the reign of Emperor Suzong, Li Guozhen was killed by soldier mutineers in the service of the imperial cause and, because of Li Guozhen's contributions, Emperor Suzong's grandson Emperor Dezong, during middle of the Zhenyuan era (785–805), had Li Qi serve as the prefect of Hu Prefecture (湖州, in modern Huzhou, Zhejiang) and then Hang Prefecture (杭州, in modern Hangzhou, Zhejiang).

As Li Qi often sent bribes to Emperor Dezong's close associate Li Qiyun (李齊運), in 799, Li Qi, who was then referred to as the prefect of Chang Prefecture (常州, in modern Changzhou, Jiangsu) was further made the prefect of Run Prefecture (潤州, in modern Zhenjiang, Jiangsu) and governor (觀察使, Guanchashi) of Zhexi Circuit (浙西, headquartered at Run Prefecture) as well as the director of salt and iron monopolies (鹽鐵使, Yantieshi). He further made tributes to Emperor Dezong, drawing Emperor Dezong's favor. As he knew he had Emperor Dezong's favor, he became arrogant and unrestrained in his behavior, and it was said that he seized the salaries of his subordinates and often killed them without good cause. A civilian from Zhexi Circuit, Cui Shanzhen (崔善貞) submitted a petition to Emperor Dezong pointing out the harm that several of Emperor Dezong's policies were having on the people, and in the petition, he accused Li Qi of crimes. Emperor Dezong read the petition and was displeased. He ordered Cui arrested and delivered to Li Qi. Li Qi, in anticipation of Cui's arrival, dug a large hole in the ground, and when Cui arrived, he had Cui thrown into the hole and buried alive.

It was also around this time that Li Qi, trying to ensure his future safety, began to expand his forces. In particular, he selected the strongest archers and made them into a special Wanqiang Corps (挽強), while selected the ethnically Xiongnu or Xi soldiers and made them into a special Fanluo Corps (蕃落). The Wanqiang and Fanluo soldiers were paid 10 times as much as the regular soldiers, in order to garner their loyalty. They referred to him as their adopted father. It was also said that he often forced women from good households to become his concubines (one of those concubines, a Lady Zheng, would later enter the imperial palace and become the mother of Emperor Xuānzong.) Li Qi's staff members Lu Tan (盧坦) and Li Yue (李約), after being unable to persuade him to curb his actions, left his staff.

== During Emperor Shunzong's reign ==
Emperor Dezong died in 805, and his son Emperor Shunzong took the throne. Soon after Emperor Shunzong became emperor, he made Li Qi the military governor of Zhenhai Circuit (i.e., Zhexi) but stripped him of the position of director of salt and iron monopolies, transferring the position to the chancellor Du You. It was said that while Li Qi thus lost the lucrative economic responsibilities, he gained a military command, and therefore did not resist the orders.

== During Emperor Xianzong's reign ==
Later in 805, Emperor Shunzong, who was seriously ill, yielded the throne to his son Emperor Xianzong. By this point, it was commonly thought that Li Qi would eventually rebel — so much so that when the official Du Jian (杜兼) was made the prefect of Su Prefecture (蘇州, in modern Suzhou, Jiangsu) late in 805, Du declined on the basis that he believed that Li Qi would soon rebel and that Du and his clan would be killed in the rebellion. Emperor Xianzong accepted Du's rationale and kept him at the imperial government.

After the rebellious general Liu Pi, who occupied Xichuan Circuit (西川, headquartered in modern Chengdu, Sichuan) was defeated and killed by imperial forces in 806, however, many regional governors became apprehensive and offered to pay homage to the new emperor. Li Qi also did so in 807, and Emperor Xianzong agreed and sent a eunuch to Zhenhai's capital Jingkou to comfort Li Qi and his soldiers. However, although Li Qi made his assistant Wang Dan (王儋) acting military governor in his anticipated absence, he did not actually intend to depart for the capital Chang'an, so he delayed his departure several times, despite urgings by the imperial eunuch and Wang for him to depart. Li Qi instead submitted a petition claiming illness and asking to delay the journey to 808. When Emperor Xianzong requested the chancellors' comments, Wu Yuanheng pointed out that Emperor Xianzong needed to assert imperial authority — and that Li Qi's offer to pay homage to him and then refusal to do so was a challenge to imperial authority. Emperor Xianzong agreed, and issued an edict summoning Li Qi to Chang'an. Li Qi, unable to think of anything else, decided to rebel. Meanwhile, Li Qi was also angered by how Wang, after being made acting military governor, was making decisions that changed his policies, and thus incited the soldiers to kill Wang. On a day when Wang and the imperial eunuch were meeting him, he had some several soldiers proclaim, "Who is this Wang Dan who dares to give orders?" The soldiers rushed into the headquarters and killed Wang, eating his body. When the officer Zhao Qi (趙琦) tried to comfort and stop the soldiers, the soldiers also killed Zhao and ate his body. When the soldiers dragged the imperial eunuch out, Li Qi pretended to be surprised and personally went to rescue the eunuch.

Meanwhile, on November 8, 807, Emperor Xianzong, issued an edict recalling Li Qi to serve as Zuo Pushe (左僕射), one of the heads of the executive bureaus of government (尚書省, Shangshu Sheng) and naming the official Li Yuansu (李元素) as his replacement as military governor of Zhenghai. The next day, Li Qi submitted a report claiming that a mutiny had led to Wang's and Zhao's deaths, apparently seeking to be allowed to remain. Meanwhile, though, he also secretly ordered five military officers that he had stationed at five prefectures under his jurisdiction — Su, Chang, Hu, Hang, and Mu (睦州, in modern Hangzhou) — to kill the prefects and seize control, and further ordered his officer Yu Boliang (庾伯良) to prepare Shitou in anticipation of an imperial attack. However, Yan Fang (顏防) the prefect of Chang Prefecture had already heard of this and killed the officer Li Qi sent to monitor him, Li Shen (李深). Yan sent communiques to the other four prefectures ordering the other four prefects to attack the rebels, and those prefects were also able to defeat Li Qi's officers, except for Li Su (李素) the prefect of Su Prefecture, who was captured by Li Qi's officer Yao Zhi'an (姚志安).

On November 14, Emperor Xianzong issued an edict stripping Li Qi of his titles and of his imperial clan membership. He ordered seven circuits around Li Qi's to converge on Zhenhai. Meanwhile, Li Qi was intending to attack and capture Xuan Prefecture (宣州, in modern Xuancheng, Anhui) due to Xuan's prosperity, and he gave 3,000 soldiers to his officers Zhang Ziliang (張子良), Li Fengxian (李奉仙), and Tian Chaoqing (田少卿) to have them attack Xuan Prefecture. However, the three of them knew that Li Qi could not stand long, and they conspired with Li Qi's nephew Pei Xingli (裴行立) to act against Li Qi. The night after they departed Run Prefecture, they informed their soldiers their intentions, and the soldiers followed them back to Run Prefecture and attacked the city. When Li Qi heard that Zhang had turned against him, he initially angrily ordered resistance, but when he heard that Pei joined Zhang as well, he became saddened and found the situation hopeless; instead, he escaped and tried to hide. When one of his officers, Li Jun (李均), tried to resist with 300 Wanqiang soldiers, Pei defeated and killed Li Jun. Li Qi was captured and delivered to Chang'an. The Wanqiang and Fanluo soldiers, hearing this, all committed suicide.

The chancellors initially discussed executing Li Qi's cousins. The official Jiang Ai (蔣乂) pointed out that Li Qi's cousins were all Li Shentong's descendants and should not suffer this kind of fate. When the chancellors discussed alternatively that Li Qi's brothers be executed, Jiang further pointed out how Li Guozhen had died in imperial service, and that his descendants should be allowed to survive. The chancellors agreed and only exiled Li Qi's cousins.

On December 3, Li Qi arrived at Chang'an. Emperor Xianzong personally questioned him as to why he rebelled. Li Qi responded, "I did not want to rebel. It was Zhang Ziliang and others like him who told me to rebel." Emperor Xianzong responded, "You are the commander. If Zhang and the others were plotting treason, why did you not execute them and then come to see me?" Li Qi was unable to respond, and he was executed with his son Li Shihui (李師回) by being cut in half at the waist. His assets were confiscated by the imperial treasury; in substitution, because Li Qi's wealth came from the people, the people of Zhenhai were exempted from taxation that year.

== See also ==
Lady Du Qiu

== Notes and references ==
- Old Book of Tang, vol. 112.
- New Book of Tang, vol. 224, part 1.
- Zizhi Tongjian, vols. 235, 236, 237.
