= Wang Chengzong =

Tang dynasty military governor

Wang Chengzong (Chinese: 王承宗) (died 820) was a general of the Chinese Tang dynasty who served a military governor (jiedushi) of Chengde Circuit (成德, headquartered in modern Shijiazhuang, Hebei). He, like his grandfather Wang Wujun and father Wang Shizhen before him, ruled the circuit in a de facto independent manner from the imperial government, drawing two imperial campaigns against him, both of which he withstood. After the defeat of his ally Wu Yuanji in 817, he submitted to imperial authority, and, after his death, his brother Wang Chengyuan left the circuit, ending his family's hold on Chengde.

== Background ==
It is not known when Wang Chengzong was born, although it was known that he was born before his brother Wang Chengyuan, who was born in 801. He was the oldest son of Wang Shizhen, who was then deputy military governor of Chengde under Wang Chengzong's grandfather Wang Wujun. After Wang Shizhen succeeded Wang Wujun as military governor in 801, Wang Chengzong eventually became the acting governor of Chengde's capital Heng Prefecture (恆州, in modern Shijiazhuang, Hebei) as well as deputy military governor of the circuit—effectively, Wang Shizhen's designated successor.

== First campaign of resistance against the imperial government ==
Wang Shizhen died in 809, and Wang Chengzong claimed the title of acting military governor. Soon thereafter, his uncle (Wang Shizhen's brother) Wang Shize (王士則), fearing imperial punishments for Wang Chengzong's claiming the title without imperial sanction, fled to territory held by the imperial government and submitted to Emperor Xianzong. Meanwhile, Emperor Xianzong considered forcibly imposing another military governor on Chengde and attacking it if Wang Chengzong refused to yield. The chancellor Pei Ji and the imperial scholar Li Jiang believed such a course of action to be imprudent, pointing out that Chengde would be difficult to conquer. The powerful eunuch Tutu Chengcui, however, advocated a campaign against Chengde, as did Lu Congshi (盧從史) the military governor of Zhaoyi Circuit (昭義, headquartered in modern Changzhi, Shanxi). Emperor Xianzong hesitated, and considered another course of action—making Wang Chengzong military governor, but ordering Wang to surrender two of Chengde's six prefectures, De (德州, in modern Dezhou, Shandong) and Di (棣州, in modern Binzhou, Shandong) Prefectures, to be formed into a new circuit.

Meanwhile, Wang was becoming apprehensive about the lack of imperial approval for his succession. When Emperor Xianzong sent the official Pei Wu (裴武) to Chengde to comfort the soldiers, Wang offered to surrender De and Di Prefectures. After Pei returned to the Tang capital Chang'an, Emperor Xianzong issued an edict naming Wang military governor of Chengde, while forming a separate circuit, Baoxin Circuit (保信), out of De and Di Prefectures and naming a relative of Wang's by marriage, Xue Changchao (薛昌朝) the prefect of De Prefecture, its military governor. Wang's ally Tian Ji'an the military governor of Weibo Circuit (魏博, headquartered in modern Handan, Hebei), however, informed Wang that Xue had received the position by turning to the imperial government; in response, Wang had Xue arrested and brought back to Heng Prefecture. When Emperor Xianzong subsequently ordered Wang to allow Xue to assume his post, Wang refused, and Emperor Xianzong responded by stripping Wang of his titles and commissioning Tutu as the commander of the forces against Chengde.

The forces of several circuits—Hedong (河東, headquartered in modern Taiyuan, Shanxi), Hezhong (河中, headquartered in modern Yuncheng, Shanxi), Zhenwu (振武, headquartered in modern Hohhot, Inner Mongolia)—soon joined the forces of Chengde's neighboring circuit Yiwu (義武, headquartered in modern Baoding, Hebei) in attacking Chengde from the north, while forces commanded by Tutu attacked it from the south. Liu Ji the military governor of Lulong Circuit (盧龍, headquartered in modern Beijing) also attacked Chengde on his own. However, it was said that because the generals did not respect Tutu, his command was not successful, and after the general Li Dingjin (酈定進) was killed in battle, morale was low.

Meanwhile, Lu, who had advocated the campaign against Wang, was actually in secret communication with Wang. Tutu discovered this, and, under Emperor Xianzong's orders, Tutu arrested Lu. Emperor Xianzong subsequently replaced Lu with Meng Yuanyang (孟元陽). After Lu's arrest, Wang submitted petitions claiming that it was Lu who alienated him from the imperial government and that he was willing to submit tax revenues and permit the imperial government to commission his subordinate officials to show submission. Wang's ally Li Shidao the military governor of Pinglu Circuit (平盧, headquartered in modern Tai'an, Shandong) also made the same request on his behalf. In summer 810, Emperor Xianzong, seeing that the campaign against Wang was unsuccessful, agreed to exonerate Wang and make him military governor, and further officially returned De and Di to Chengde.

== Between the two campaigns ==
Meanwhile, by 815, Emperor Xianzong's forces were deeply entrenched in a campaign against another ally of Wang Chengzong's, Wu Yuanji, who ruled Zhangyi Circuit (彰義, headquartered in modern Zhumadian, Henan). Wu sought aid from both Wang and Li Shidao, and both sought pardons on his behalf, but the requests were rejected by Emperor Xianzong. Li Shidao reacted by having his soldiers wage guerilla warfare against imperial territory around the eastern capital Luoyang. Wang sent his officer Yin Shaoqing (尹少卿) to Chang'an to lobby for Wu, but when Yin met the chancellor Wu Yuanheng, Yin was insolent in his language, and Wu Yuanheng ejected him from the office of chancellors. Wang then submitted a petition defaming Wu Yuanheng.

Shortly after, Wu Yuanheng was assassinated—probably by assassins sent by Li—and another official who advocated for the campaign against Wu Yuanji, Pei Du, was nearly also killed. Suspicions fell on eight Chengde officers stationed at Chang'an, headed by Zhang Yan (張晏). Wang Chengzong's uncle Wang Shize himself reported that Zhang and the other Chengde officers must be responsible. The Chengde officers were arrested and interrogated by Pei Wu and the imperial censor Chen Zhongshi (陳中師). Under intense interrogation, probably including torture, Zhang and the others confessed to assassinating Wu Yuanheng and were executed. In fall 815, Emperor Xianzong issued an edict declaring Wang's guilt and refusing to accept his tributes, but not declaring a campaign against Wang by this point; rather, the edict called on Wang to examine himself and repent.

== Second campaign of resistance against the imperial government ==
Meanwhile, Tian Hongzheng (a relative of Tian Ji'an's, who had died in 812) the military governor of Weibo—under whose governance Weibo had become imperial territory—stationed his forces near Weibo's borders with Chengde. Wang Chengzong repeatedly harassed his troops, and in anger, Tian requested permission to attack Chengde territory. Emperor Xianzong agreed, and Tian advanced into Chengde territory, but did not advance far. Emperor Xianzong also ordered Zhenwu forces to join Yiwu forces in attacking Chengde. In response, Wang pillaged the territories of Lulong, Henghai (橫海, headquartered in modern Cangzhou, Hebei), and Yiwu. Those circuits advocated a campaign against Wang, and Emperor Xianzong agreed, over the objection of the chancellor Zhang Hongjing, who thereafter resigned. Another chancellor who also opposed the campaign, Wei Guanzhi, was soon exiled. However, it was said that of the six circuits ordered to attack Chengde (Hedong, Lulong, Yiwu, Henghai, Weibo, and Zhaoyi), most of the forces did not advance far, although Zhaoyi's military governor Chi Shimei (郗士美) scored some victories over Chengde forces. When Hun Gao (渾鎬) the military governor of Yiwu advanced deep into Chengde territory as well, Wang responded by sending operatives into Yiwu territory to burn Yiwu's towns and villages, causing Yiwu soldiers to become fearful for their families. He subsequently defeated Hun, and Hun fled back to Yiwu and was subsequently replaced by another general, Chen Chu (陳楚). He also cut off the communications lines between Henghai's capital Cang Prefecture (滄州) and Henghai troops, under the command of its military governor Cheng Quan (程權), forcing Cheng's withdrawal.

By 817, the expenditures of the imperial forces in waging campaigns against Chengde and Zhangyi simultaneously were so high and the returns so low that Emperor Xianzong was reconsidering his strategy. Listening to the chancellor Li Fengji and other officials who advocated concentrating on defeating Zhangyi first, in summer 817, Emperor Xianzong ordered the circuits attacking Chengde to withdraw their forces back to their own circuits.

== Submission to imperial authority ==
In winter 817, imperial forces under Li Su entered Zhangyi's capital Cai Prefecture (蔡州) and captured Wu Yuanji, whom Emperor Xianzong subsequently executed. Wang, hearing of Wu's defeat, became fearful, and he sent his two sons Wang Zhigan (王知感) and Wang Zhixin (王知信) to Tian Hongzheng, offering them as hostages and further offering to surrender De and Di Prefectures to imperial control. With Tian interceding on Wang's behalf, Emperor Xianzong agreed, accepting Wang's submission and restoring his titles. De and Di were merged into Henghai Circuit. When Emperor Xianzong subsequently waged a campaign against Li Shidao, who made a similar offer to Emperor Xianzong but then reneged, Wang Chengzong's brother Wang Chengyuan suggested that he join the imperial campaign against Pinglu, but Wang Chengzong did not do so.

In winter 820, by which point Emperor Xianzong had died and been succeeded by his son Emperor Muzong, Wang Chengzong died, although his subordinates kept the news of his death secret. With his sons Wang Zhigan and Wang Zhixin at Chang'an, the soldiers initially did not know whom to support as their new military governor. Wang Chengzong's staff member Cui Sui (崔燧) issued an order in the name of Wang Chengzong's grandmother Lady of Liang (Wang Wujun's wife) naming Wang Chengyuan his successor. Wang Chengyuan accepted acting military governor authority but did not want to try to succeed Wang Chengzong permanently, and thus sent secret communications to Emperor Muzong offering to yield the circuit and then announced Wang Chengzong's death. Emperor Muzong, in response, named Tian the new military governor of Chengde and Wang Chengyuan the military governor of Yicheng Circuit (義成, headquartered in modern Anyang, Henan); Wang Chengyuan then left Chengde, ending the Wang family's hold on Chengde. Emperor Muzong gave Wang Chengzong posthumous honors.

== Notes and references ==
- Old Book of Tang, vol. 142.
- New Book of Tang, vol. 211.
- Zizhi Tongjian, 237, 238, 239, 240, 241.
