= Li Ning (Tang dynasty) =

Chinese crown prince (793–812)

Li Ning (李寧) (793 – February 7, 812), briefly known as Li Zhou (李宙) in 809, formally Crown Prince Huizhao (惠昭太子), was a crown prince of the Chinese Tang dynasty during the reign of his father Emperor Xianzong.

== Background ==
Li Ning was born in 793, when his father Emperor Xianzong was the Prince of Guangling, during the reign of his great-grandfather Emperor Dezong, as the then-prince's oldest son. His mother was Li Chun's concubine Lady Ji. After Emperor Dezong's death in 805, Li Ning's grandfather Li Song became emperor (as Emperor Shunzong), and, as a grandson of the emperor, Li Ning was created the Prince of Pingyuan. Later in the year, Emperor Shunzong, who was seriously ill, passed the throne to Li Chun (as Emperor Xianzong). In 806, Emperor Xianzong created a number of his sons greater princely titles, and Li Ning was created the Prince of Deng. However, Li Ning's mother Consort Ji was not greatly honored, as the title she received, Meiren (美人), was not a unique title (potentially, there could be nine Meiren at one time) and was only the 15th highest title possible for imperial consorts.

== As crown prince ==
In 809, along with a number of imperial scholars, led by Li Jiang, requesting that Emperor Xianzong create a crown prince, Emperor Xianzong created Li Ning crown prince on May 9. He also changed Li Ning's name to Li Zhou, but soon changed it back to Li Ning. Meanwhile, Li Ning's formal investiture ceremony, initially set for the fourth month of the Chinese calendar, was delayed initially to the 10th month of the lunar year, and then delayed again, both times due to rain, but finally held in the 10th month. He died just before the Chinese new year in 812. Emperor Xianzong mourned his death with a 13-day mourning period. As the regulations on imperial ceremonies at the time lacked any regulations on the funeral for a crown prince, he put a professor of the imperial university, Pei Chai (裴茝), in charge of Li Ning's funeral.
