= Military history of the Tang dynasty =

Part of Chinese history, 618–907 CE

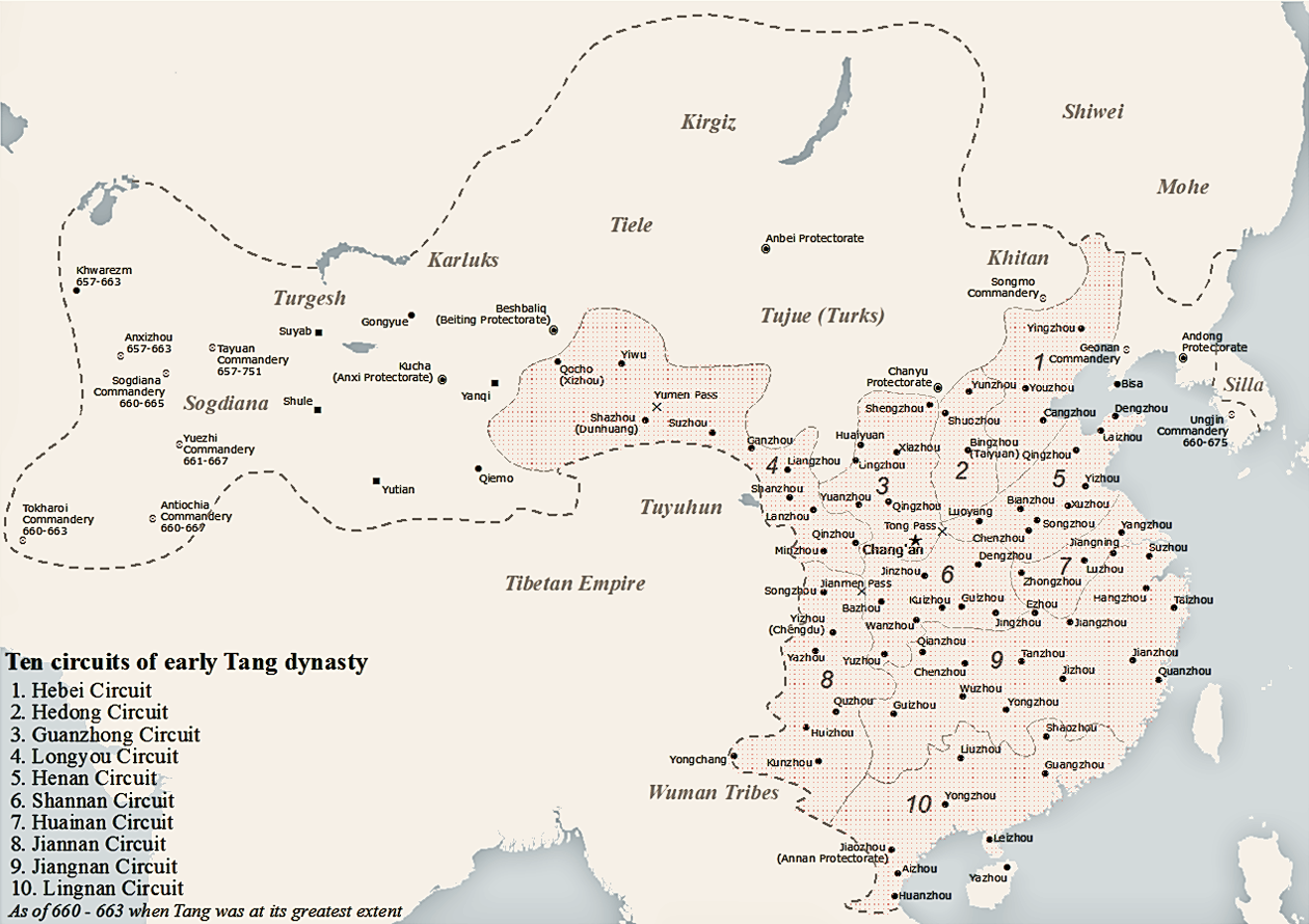
The Tang dynasty at its height in the 660s

The military history of the Tang dynasty encompasses the period of Chinese military activity from 618 to 907. The Tang dynasty and the preceding Sui dynasty share many similar trends and behaviors in terms of military tactics, strategy, and technology, so it can be viewed that the Tang continued the Sui tradition.

== Organization ==
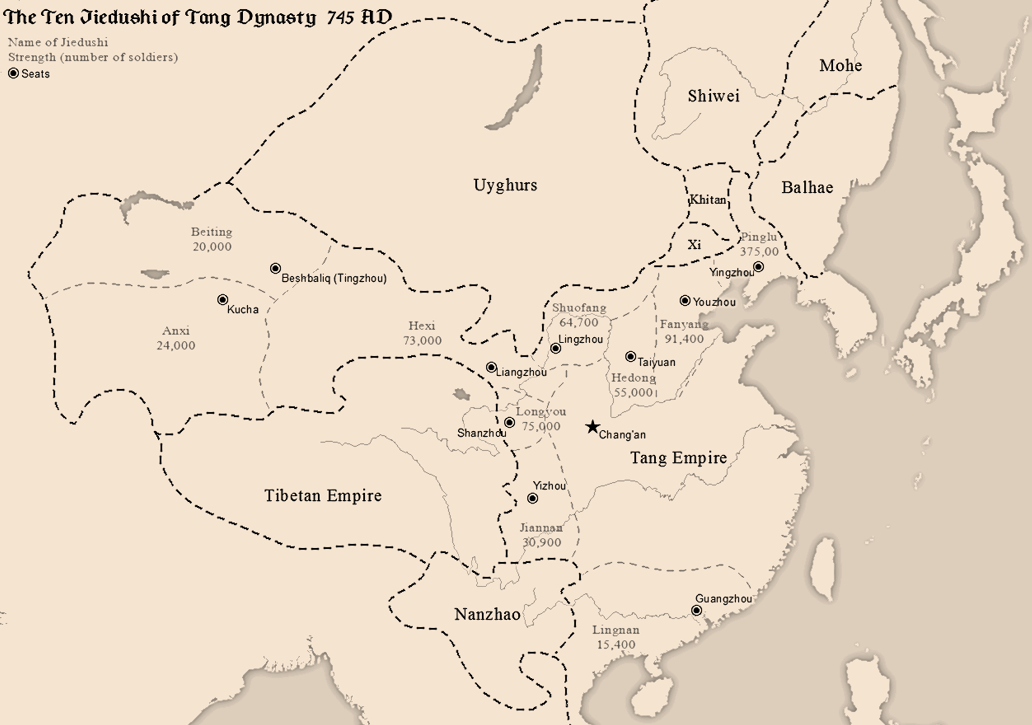
The ten jiedushi in 745

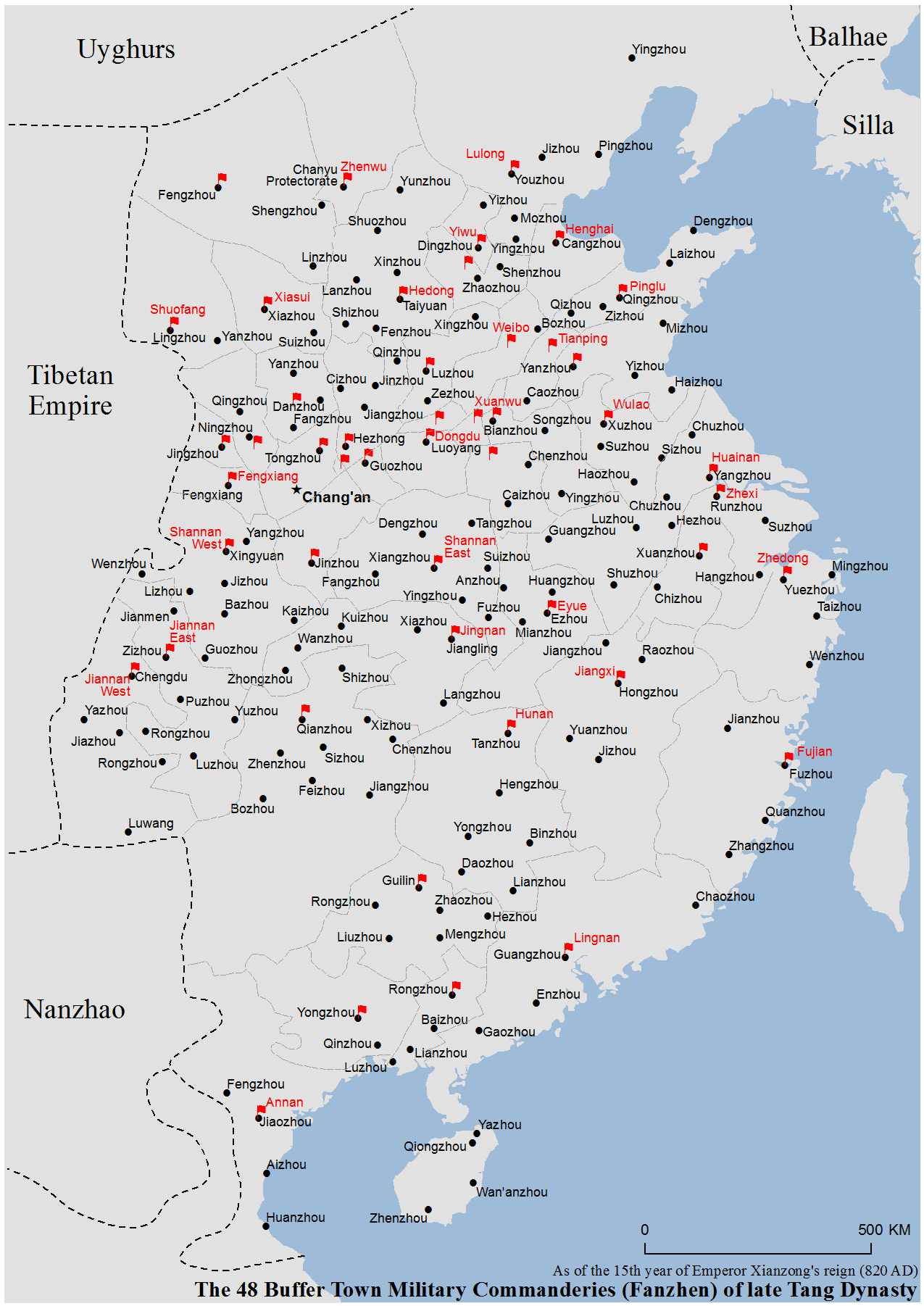
The 48 buffer towns in 820

The system of recruitment that created the Tang dynasty's Twenty-four Armies, as was the case in the preceding Sui dynasty, came to be known as fubing, or "territorial soldiery". Fubing soldiers were originally recruits drawn from the old military households of previous dynasties. Unlike the mass conscription of the Han dynasty, these soldiers were promised tangible rewards such as exemption from taxes and labor for their families. Later on, these soldiers were formed into units presiding over a plot of land on which they would farm privately to support themselves. At its height under the Tang dynasty, some 600 units of fubing were maintained, each with 800 to 1,200 soldiers. Unlike the Sui dynasty when the fubing answered only to local administration, the Tang dynasty implemented a centralized Ministry of the Army to which fubing units were answerable to. Each unit was further subdivided into battalions of 200, platoons of 50, and squads of 10. They rotated in and out of the capital for guard duty and training depending on their distance to it. Those nearest to it served one month in five, those furthest from it, two months out of every eighteen. Some men were assigned to three year tours in frontier garrisons. Deployment of the fubing units was monopolized by the court through the use of bronze tallies with the names of each unit on them. Half of the tally was kept at the Credentials Office while the other half was kept at unit headquarters. Only when the two halves were joined could a unit be mobilized.

Due to the fact that they combined military service with farming, the fubing have sometimes been characterized as a "militia" by Western authors. With its connotations of low quality and ineffectiveness (especially on account of the implied contrast with a "professional" soldiery), this term is rather misleading when used in connection with the fubing. Given their life-long military service and the training they received over that period, it would be more accurate to view them as a special type of professional soldier.

— David Graff

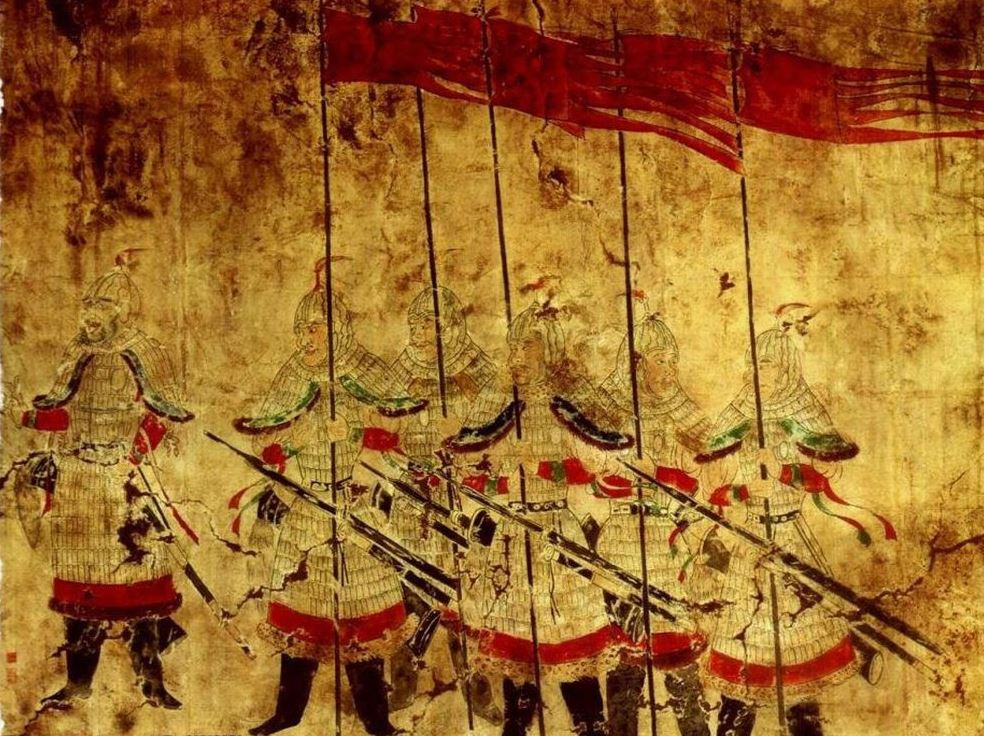
Elite Tang troops, Honor Guards of Princess Changle

While the fubing was well suited to local conflicts and short term campaigns, its shortcomings became apparent in the late 7th century as protracted wars and the needs of permanent static defense took their toll. The initial benefits of entering the system wore off as more men died in wars in far off lands, never to return. The military structure was not suited to properly reward soldiers who performed meritorious service in battle. Many who were supposed to be rewarded and compensated were not. Families of dead soldiers were also not compensated properly, resulting in reduced morale, and widespread desertion as well as dereliction of duty. The geographical distribution of fubing units was highly unevenly distributed, with the northwestern part of the empire shouldering most of the burden, while two thirds of the empire contained not even one unit of fubing. With so many units concentrated in one region, the government found it difficult to find enough farm land for their soldiers, who also competed with regular farmers under the equal-field system.

The fubing system was gradually replaced with a standing army. First, frontier garrisons were taken over by permanent troops known as jian'er in 677. In 710, frontier forces were bolstered to withstand invasions without the help of levied troops. Nine frontier commands were established, each with their own defense army and military governor, the jiedushi. In 737, the court decided to replace irregular troops entirely with permanent soldiers, recruited from volunteers in the general population. The fubing system was abolished in 749. The shift to a permanent army resulted in a sevenfold increase in the defense budget, from two million strings of copper cash in 712 to twelve million in 742, and then fifteen million by 755.

The king of India has many troops, but they are not paid as regular soldiers; instead, he summons them to fight for king and country, and they go to war at their own expense and at no cost at all to the king. In contrast, the Chinese give their troops regular pay, as the Arabs do.

— Abu Zayd al-Hasan al-Sirafi

By 742 the frontier had been organized into ten regional military commands. Nine were headed by jiedushi. The post of jiedushi was an imperial commissionership with authority over the military, public revenue, and state lands. In essence, it was a provincial governorship. One jiedushi eventually rebelled in 755, causing the An Lushan Rebellion. Despite its defeat in 763, the number of jiedushi proliferated in response to the rebellion and had increased to approximately 40 by the end of the rebellion. The Tang court failed to reign in the northeastern jiedushi, who were functionally independent warlords, in particular and the balance of power seesawed between the two forces until the Huang Chao rebellion from 874 to 884. The Tang dynasty then collapsed.

=== Army operation ===
According to the Tongdian (Comprehensive Canons), an expeditionary army consisted of 20,000 men in seven divisions of 2,600 or 4,000 men. Only 14,000 were actual combat troops while the rest guarded the baggage train. Of those 14,000, there were 2,000 archers, 2,000 crossbowmen, 4,000 cavalry, and the rest regular foot soldiers. Twelve thousand men were to be provided with armour.

The basic operational tactical unit was a platoon of 50 men, fixed five ranks deep. It had five officers: commander, deputy, standard-bearer, and two color guards. For every six platoons, one guarded the baggage train. When the entire army was deployed, the troops were formed into two lines with cavalry at their flanks. Movements were communicated with drums and gongs. Drum beats to advance and gongs to halt. Directions came from five flags, each with a different color to indicate the five directions. When two flags were crossed, it signaled for the platoons to combine into a larger formation.

The Tang army also made use of scouts on campaign. A pair of scouts were sent out for each of the four directions at different distances. Two at five li, another two at ten li, and so on until they reached 30 li.

=== Military examination ===
In 702, Wu Zetian introduced military examinations for the recruitment of military officers. Examinees were tested on their skill with the bow and arrow, cavalry lance, as well as physical strength and command "presence". The imperial military exams had very little effect on the composition of the officer corps. While local military exams were administered, the final decision came down to the military governors, whose personnel appointments were routinely approved by the court. For example, at the beginning of 755, An Lushan replaced 32 Han Chinese commanders with his own barbarian favorites without any repercussions.

== Equipment ==
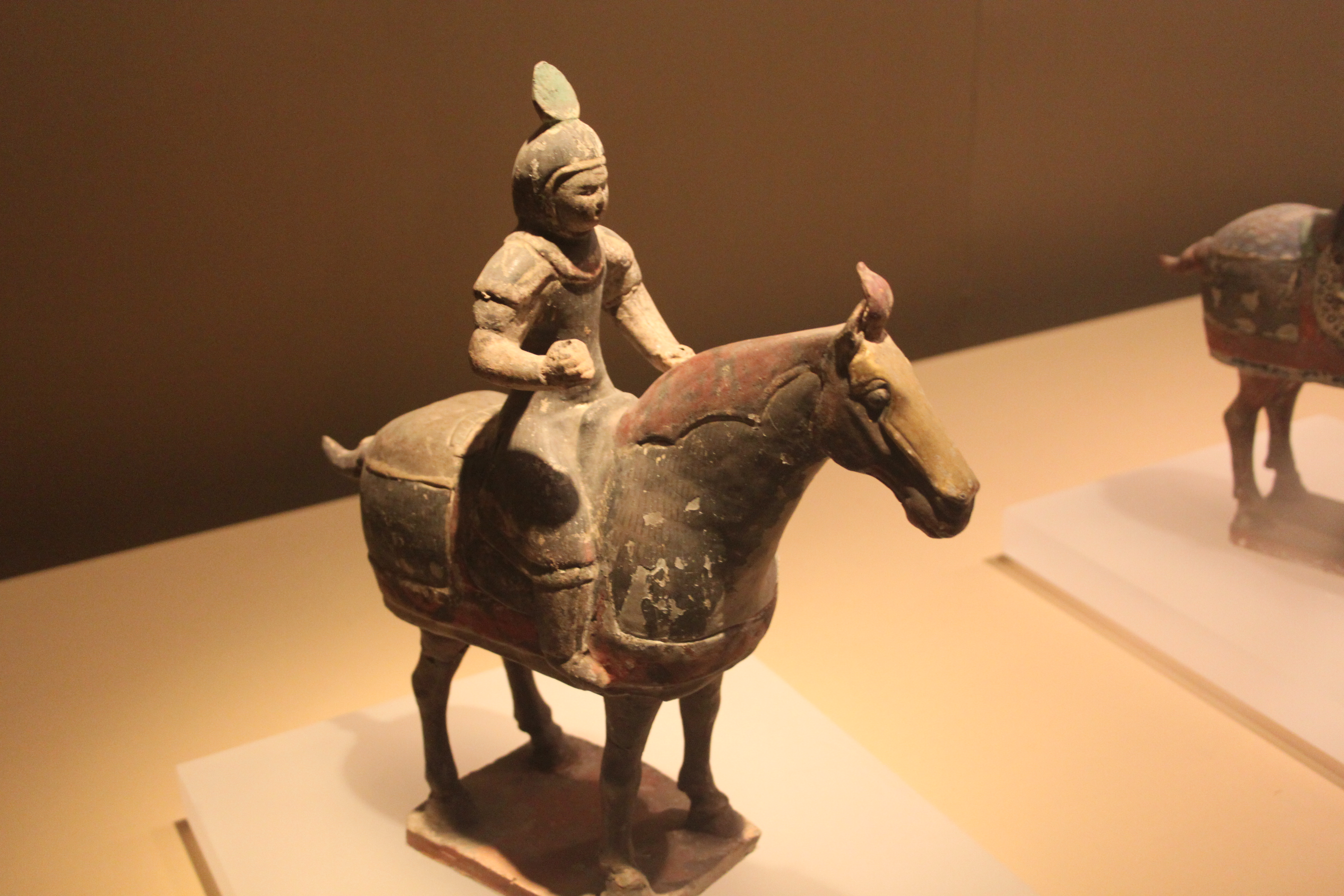
Tang cavalry figurine

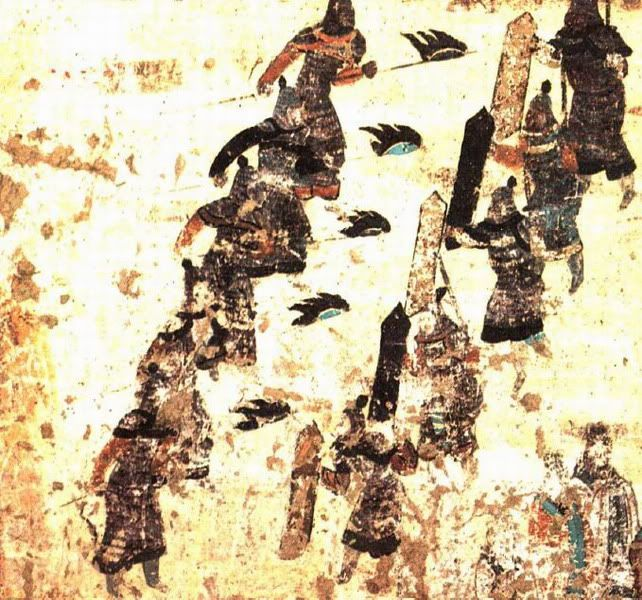
Tang soldiers holding shields

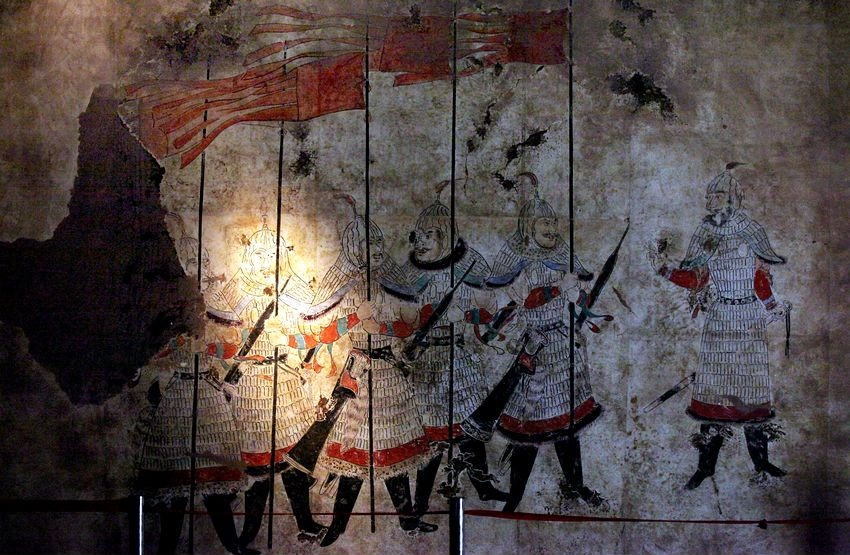
Tang Elite soldiers heavily donned in lamellar armour

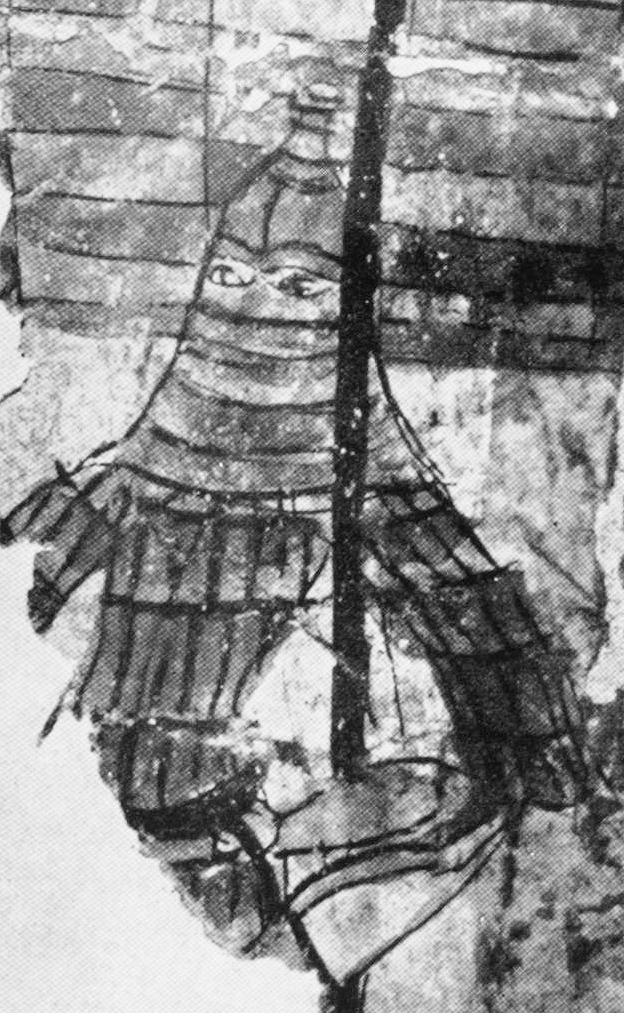
Armoured soldier from Gaochang, 8-9th century

=== Cavalry ===
By the Tang dynasty it was possible for armour to provide immense personal protection. Heavy cavalry played an important role in the Tang army during the wars following the Sui dynasty's collapse. In one instance Li Shimin's cousin, Li Daoxuan, was able to cut his way through the entire enemy mass of Xia soldiers and then cut his way back again, repeating the operation several times before the battle was won, at which point he had so many arrows sticking out of his armour that he looked like a "porcupine." In another battle between Li Shimin and Wang Shichong, Li and his entourage of 500 armoured cavalry were attacked by a light cavalry force led by Shan Xiongxin. Shan charged at Li directly but was intercepted by one of Li's generals, Yuchi Gong, who knocked Shan off his horse. Yuchi then led the armoured cavalry force and broke through the enemy army while Li rallied his forces and drove through Shan's light cavalry several times. The arrows and spears of Wang's forces had little effect on Tang heavy cavalry. The effective range of a composite bow against armoured troops in this era was considered to be around 75 to 100 yards.

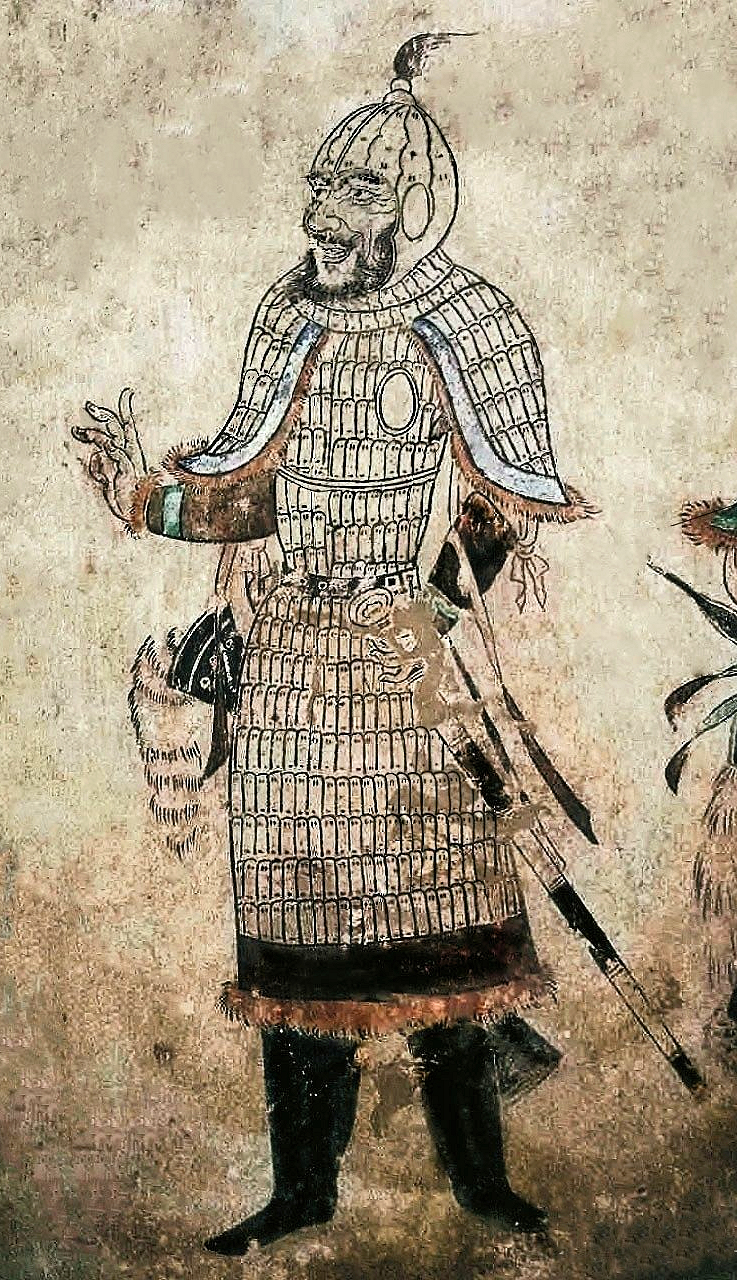
Tang Guard of honour in lamellar armour, Zhao Mausoleum

Li Shimin's elite cavalry forces were known to have worn distinctive black "iron clad" armour, but heavy cavalry declined as Turkic influence became more prevalent and light cavalry became the dominant mode of mounted warfare. In contrast to the heavily armored cavalry of the Sui dynasty, the horsemen of the Tang are often described as "light cavalry" because only the rider was armored while the horse was not. Prior to the founding of the Tang, Emperor Gaozu of Tang selected 2000 of his mounted forces and gave them the training and equipment to fight like Turks. Tang expeditionary forces to Central Asia preferred a mixture of light and heavy Chinese horse archers. After the An Lushan rebellion of the mid 8th century and losing the northwestern pastures to the Tibetans, Chinese cavalry almost disappeared altogether as a relevant military force. Many southern horses were considered too small or frail to carry an armoured soldier.

Li Shimin's six horses are described in poetry:

1. Baidiwu, a black horse with four white feet, called the ‘white hoofed crow’. In one night, the horse carried Li Shimin for 65 miles during the war with Xue Renguo (AD 618).
‘With a sword long enough to touch the sky, This swift steed could run with the wind; On one gallop, I recovered Gansu. I returned after bringing peace to Shu with one look from the saddle.’
2. Telebiao, a yellow and white horse with a slight black snout. Li Shimin rode him against Song Jingang. The horse is pictured walking on an icy road full of confidence (AD 619).
‘When whipped the horse reared into the air. The noise of the horse’s neighing reached half the land. Rushing toward danger the horse bore down on the enemy. The horse appeared at the critical moment and saved the day.’
3. Saluzi, Autumn Dew the Whirlwind Victory, a large bay horse. At the siege of Luoyang, the horse was hit by an arrow in battle. Qiu Xinggong gave his horse to Li Shimin and walked the horse back to Tang lines. The sculpture shows Qiu Xinggong pulling out the arrow (AD 612).
‘The horse was as restless as a purple swallow, The horse pranced with high spirits; The horse was feared in the region of Three Rivers, The horse struck awe into the enemy on all battlefields.’
4. Qingzhui, a piebald coloured horse. In the battles with Dou Jiande, the animal survived five arrow wounds to his front (AD 621).
‘Light footed, a streak of lightning, This horse was full of energizing spirits. I whipped up this flying steed, And so I was able to lay down my armour.’
5. Shifachi, a brick red horse. Fought in wars with Dou Jiande and Wang Shichong, defeating two enemies in one battle (AD 621).
‘There was trouble in the lands of the Chan and Jian Rivers, With poleaxes and battleaxes, I showed my power; In red sweat, this horse dashed forward, Under the green flag, our army returned, Singing the song, Victory.’
6. Quanmaogua, a saffron yellow coloured horse with a curly coat. Fought in battle against Liu Heida. The horse is pictured walking briskly forward despite severe arrow wounds, six in front, three in back (AD 622).
‘The moon rabbit grabbed the bridle, The stars of Scorpio crossed the heaven in their course, The Dog Star announced the halt, The dusty mist brought the end.’

The Turks sent 100 horses to Emperor Taizong of Tang at one point. He chose from them ten for his own personal use and named them: Frost Prancing White, Shining Snow Grizzle, Frozen Dew Grizzle, Suspended Light Grizzle, Wave Plunging Bay, Sunset Flying Roan, Lighting Darting Red, Flowing Gold Yellow, Soaring Unicorn Purple and Running Rainbow Red.

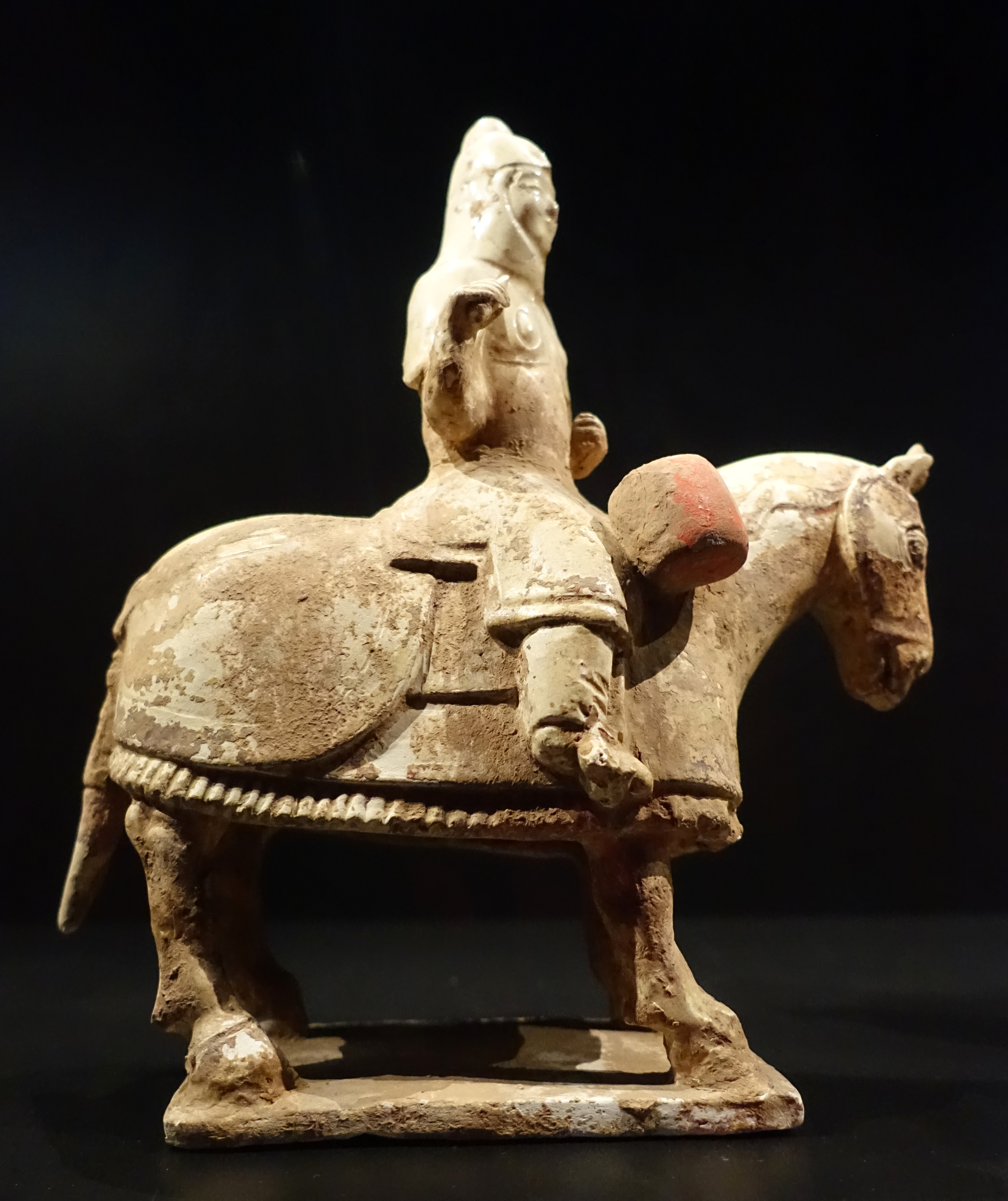
Tang cavalry figurine

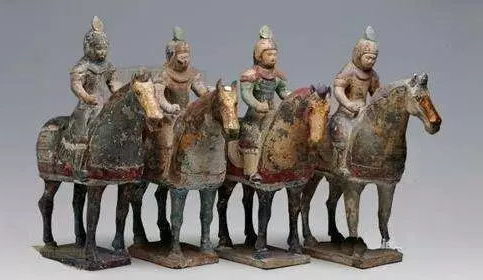
Tang dynasty cavalry figurines from the Qianling Mausoleum

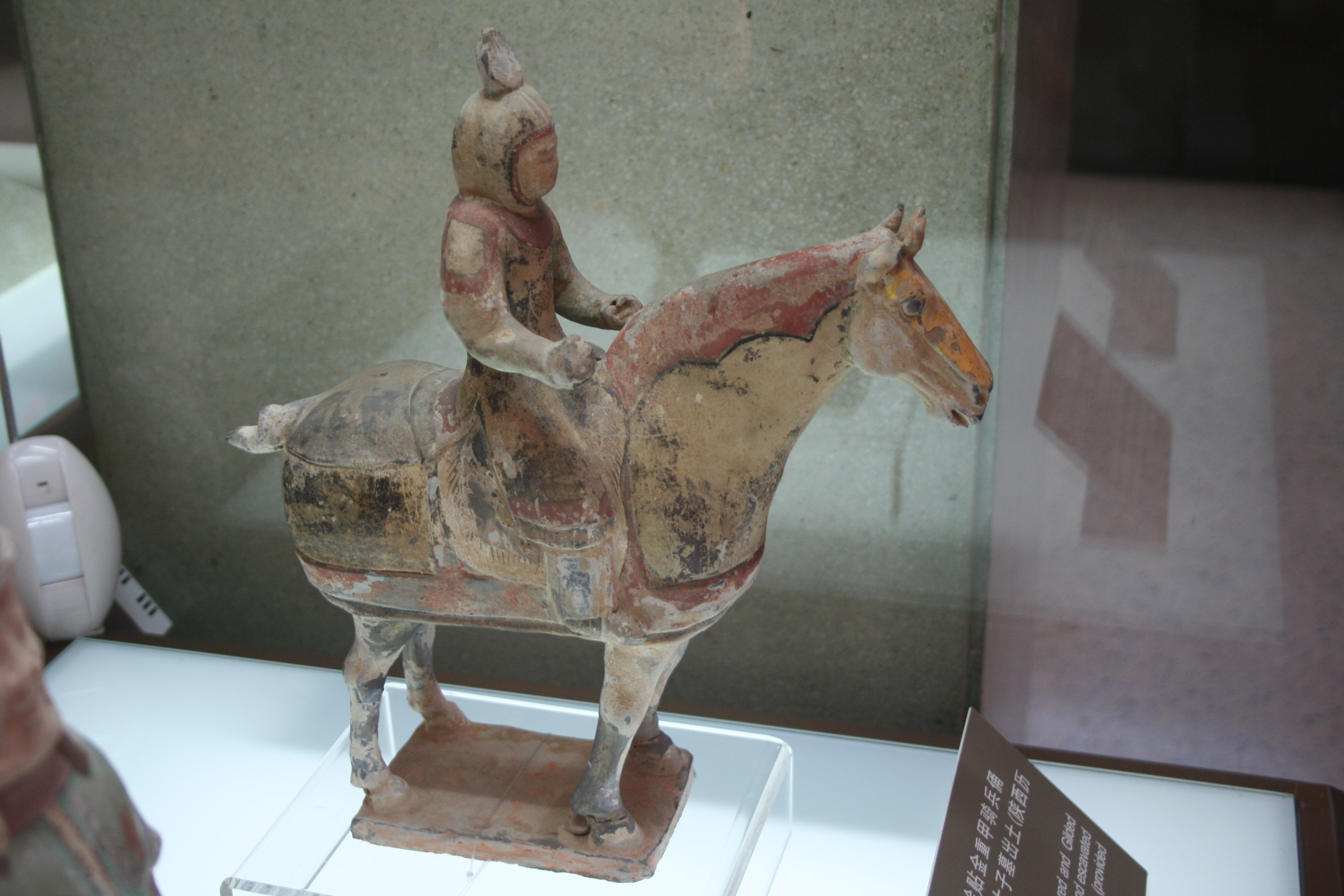
Tang cavalry figurine

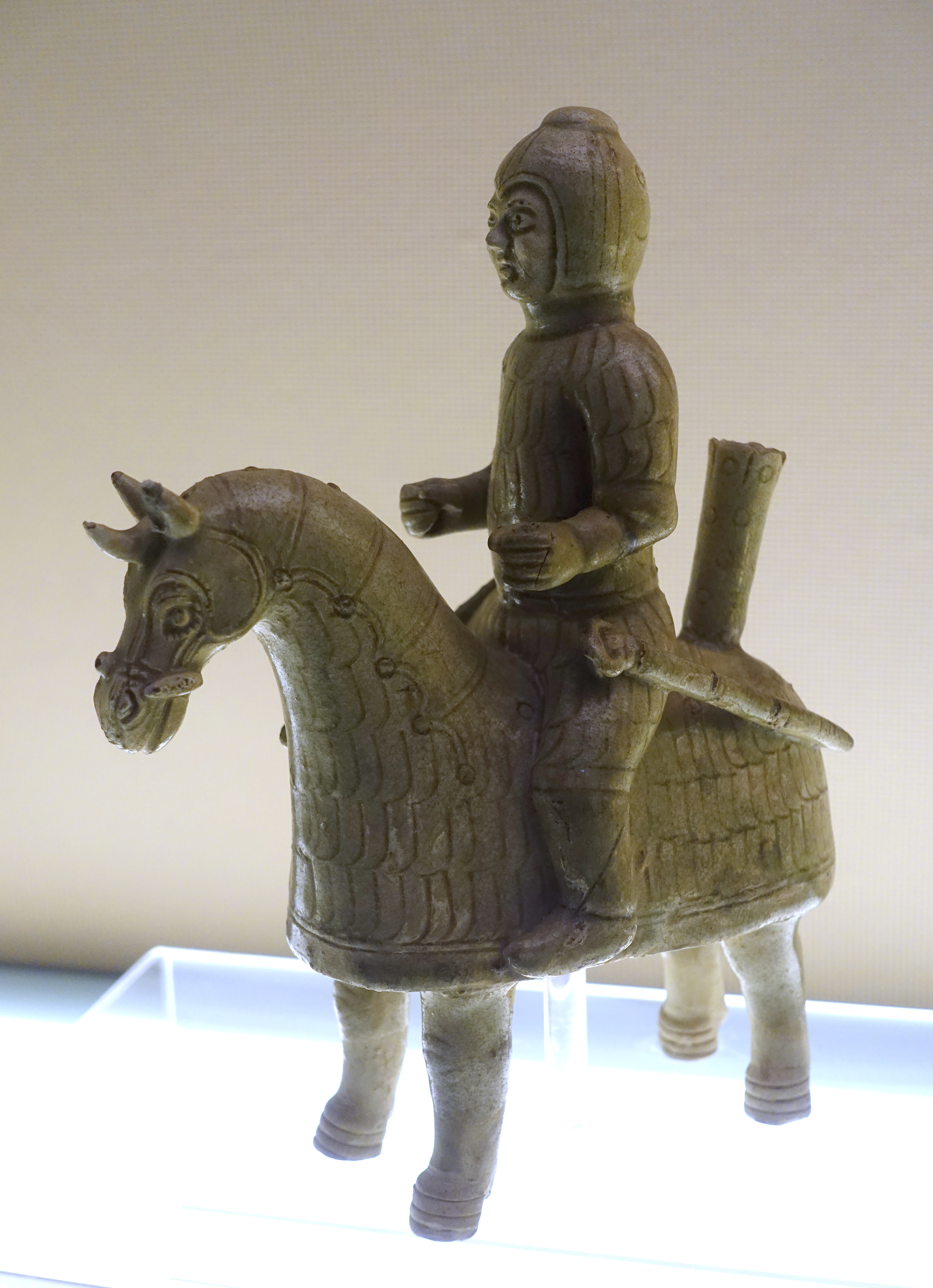
Tang cavalry figurine

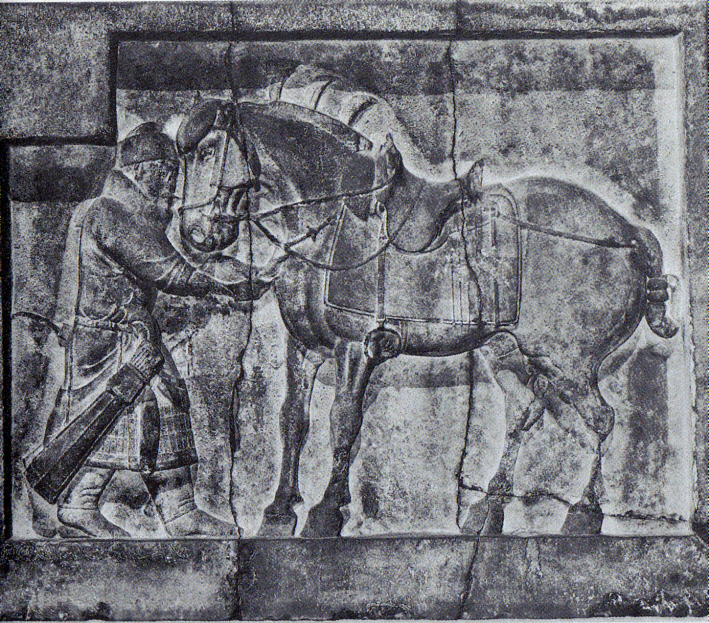
One of Tang Taizong's horses, Saluzi, Autumn Dew the Whirlwind Victory, and its handler Qiu Xinggong

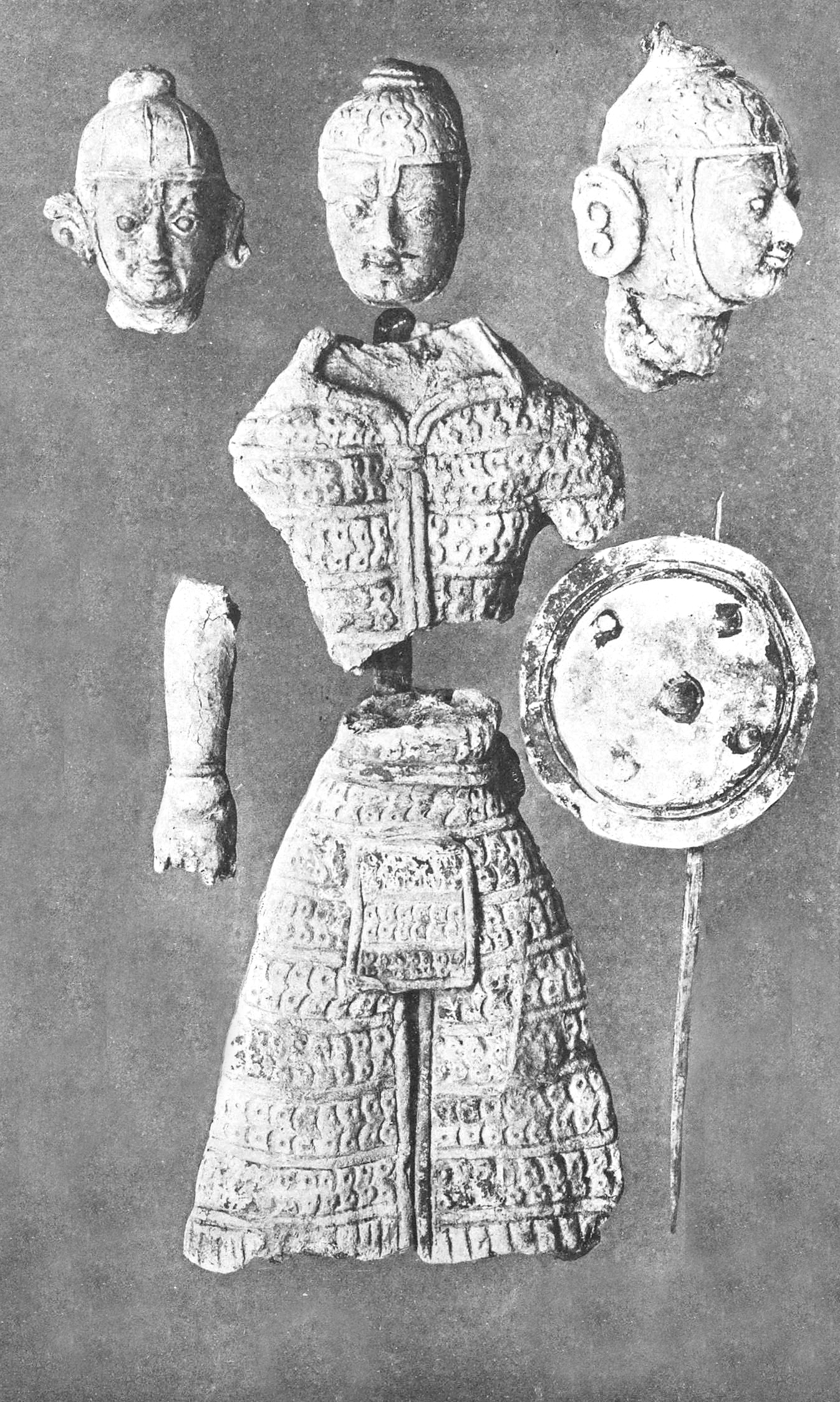
Tang statuette of an armoured Turkic horseman

=== Infantry armour ===
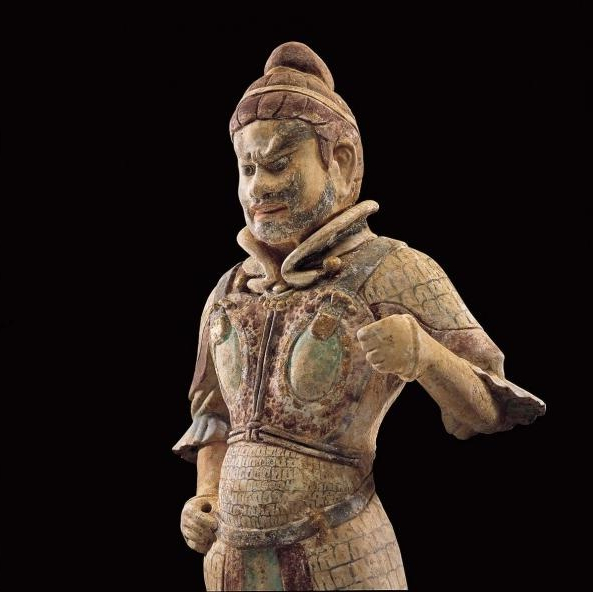
Tang warrior wearing cord and plaque armour

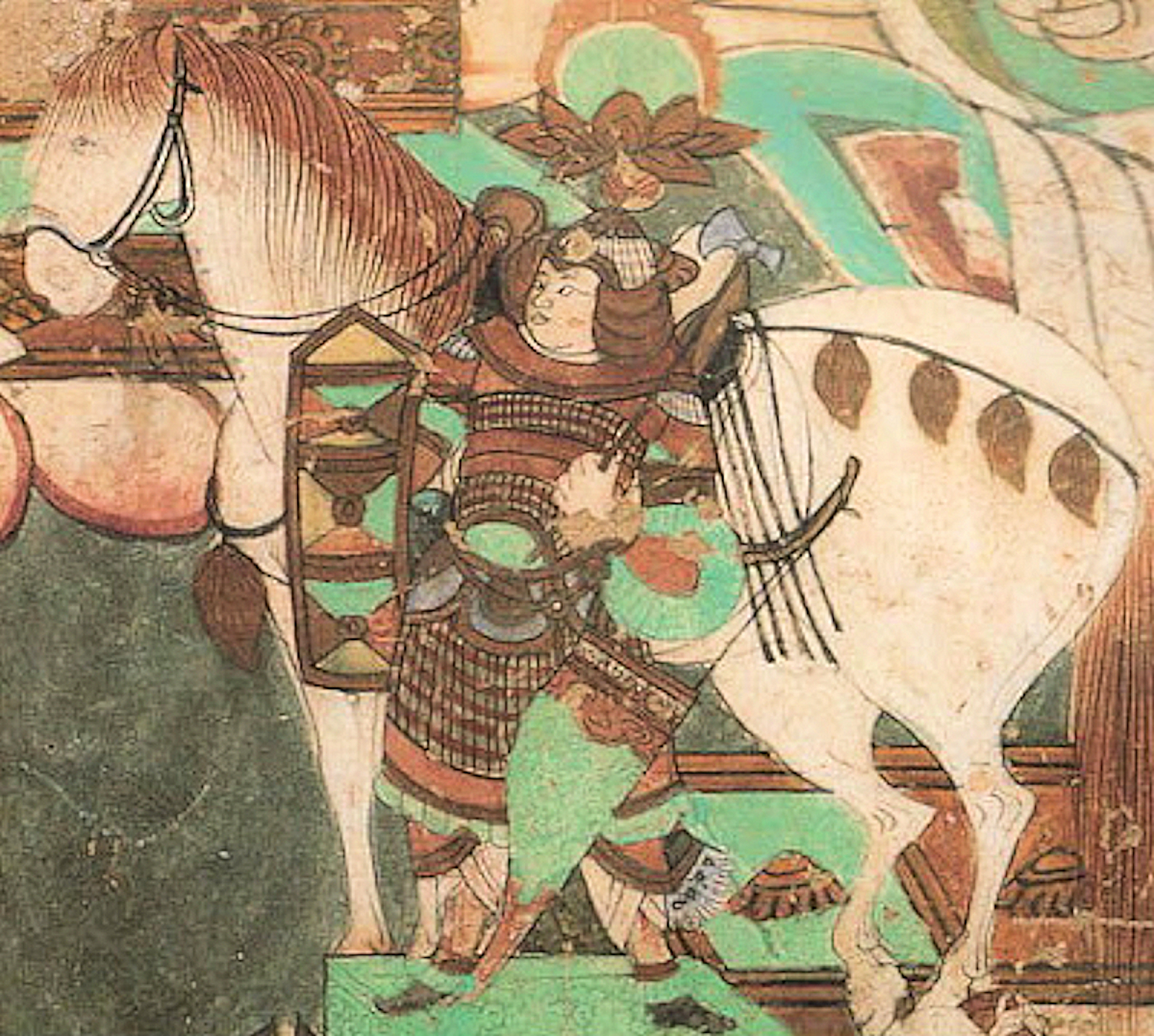
Tang soldier in a mural from Yulin Caves

Infantry armour became more common in the Tang era and roughly 60 percent of active soldiers were equipped with armour of some kind. Armour could be manufactured natively or captured as a result of war. For instance 10,000 suits of iron armour were captured during the Goguryeo–Tang War. In the early Tang period when the fubing system was still active, soldiers were supposed to supply themselves with clothing and weapons at the outset of a campaign. However, after the fubing system was replaced with permanent soldiers known as jian'er in the late 7th century, the Tang government began supplying them themselves. Armour and mounts, including pack animals, were supplied by the state through state funds, and thus considered state property. Private ownership of military equipment such as horse armour, long lances, and crossbows was prohibited. Possession was taken as intent of rebellion or treason. The army staff kept track of armour and weapons with detailed records of items issued. If a deficiency was discovered, the corresponding soldier was ordered to pay restitution. The state also provided clothing and rations for border garrisons and expeditionary armies. Soldiers not on active duty were expected to pay for themselves, although "professional" soldiers were given tax exemptions. Officers, however, were permanently employed.

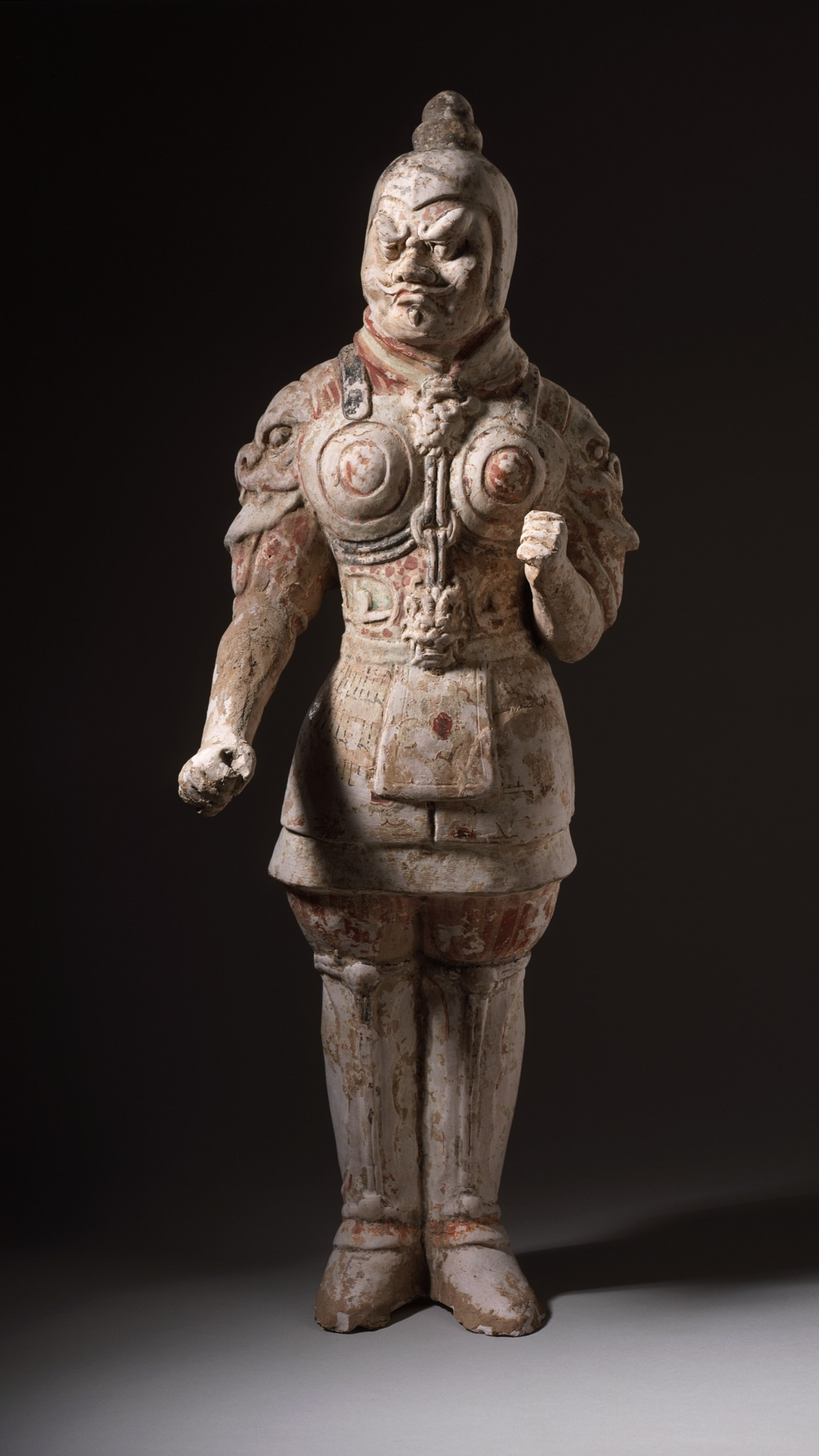
Tang warrior wearing cord and plaque armour

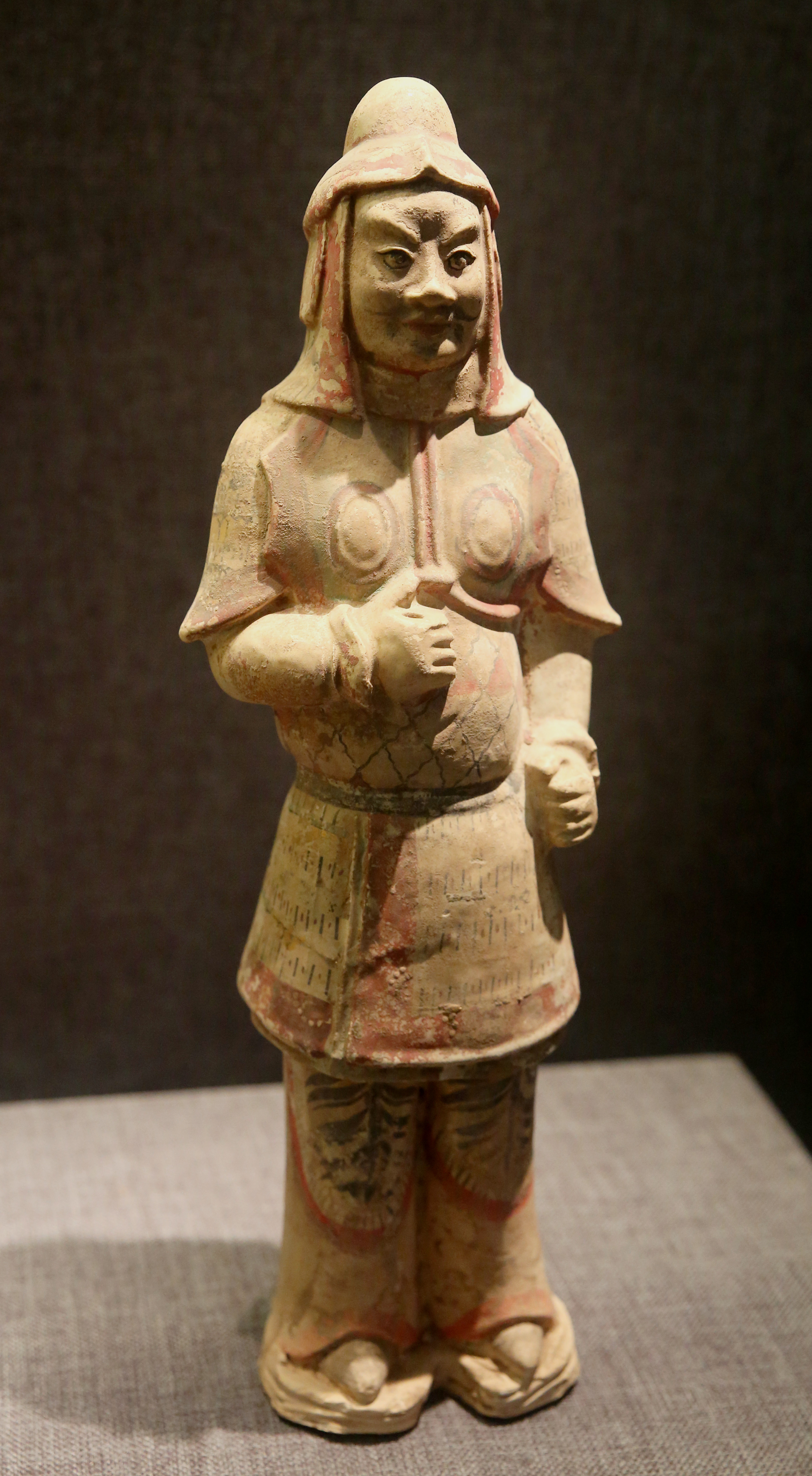
Tang soldier in cord and plaque armour

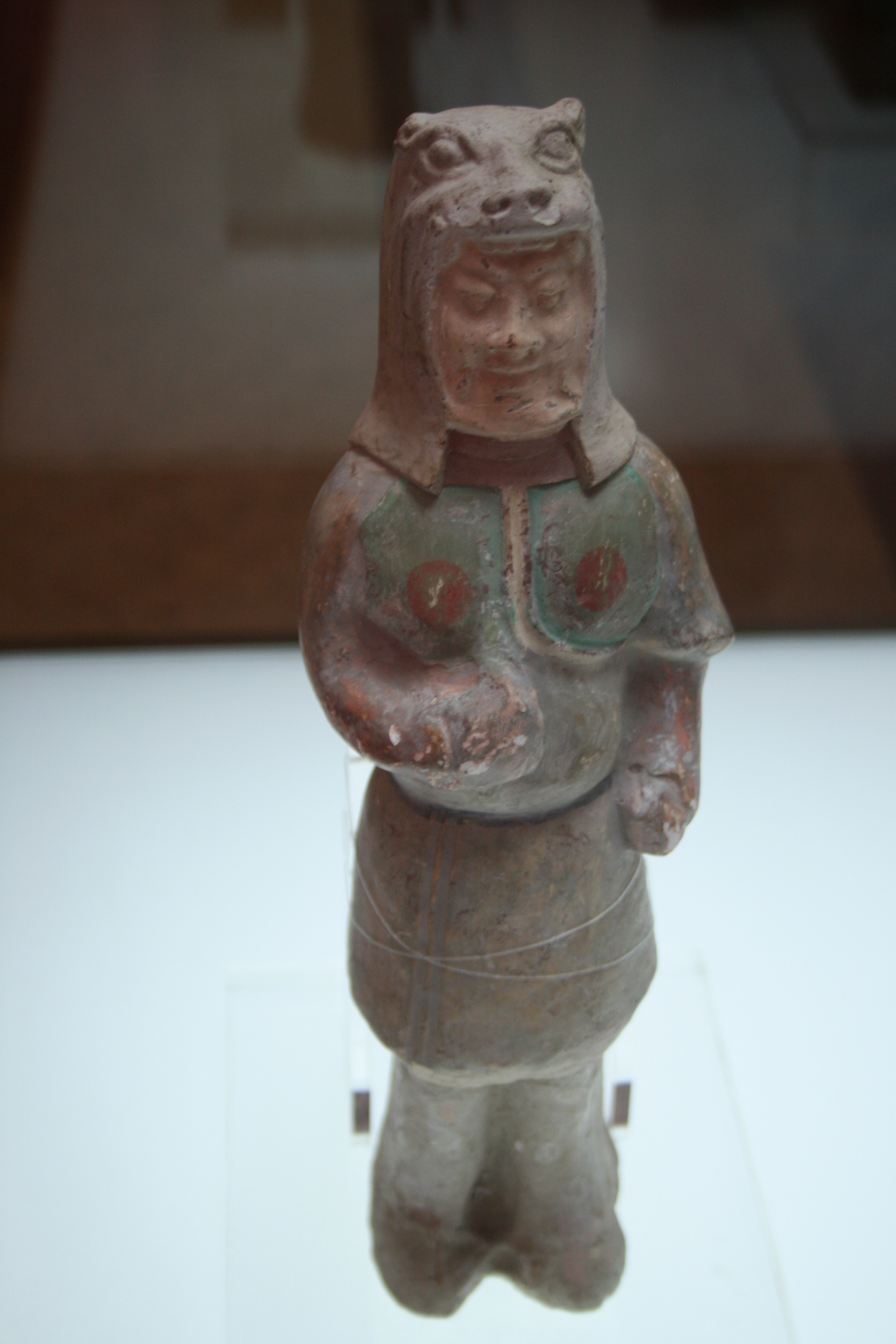
Tang soldier wearing a tiger cap

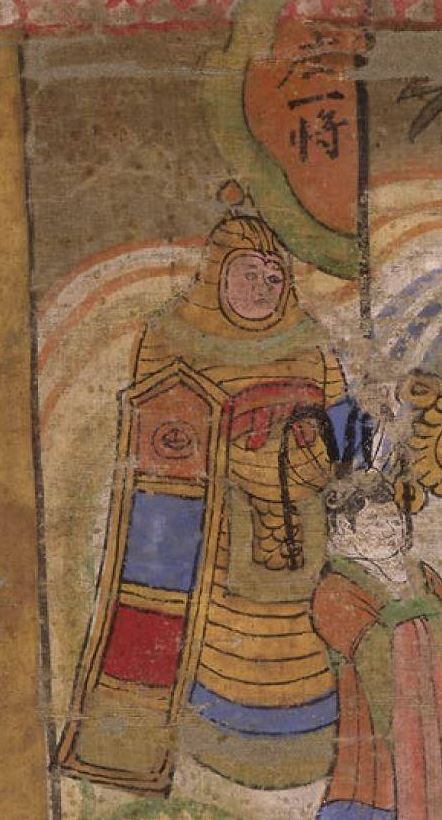
Tang soldier in a mural

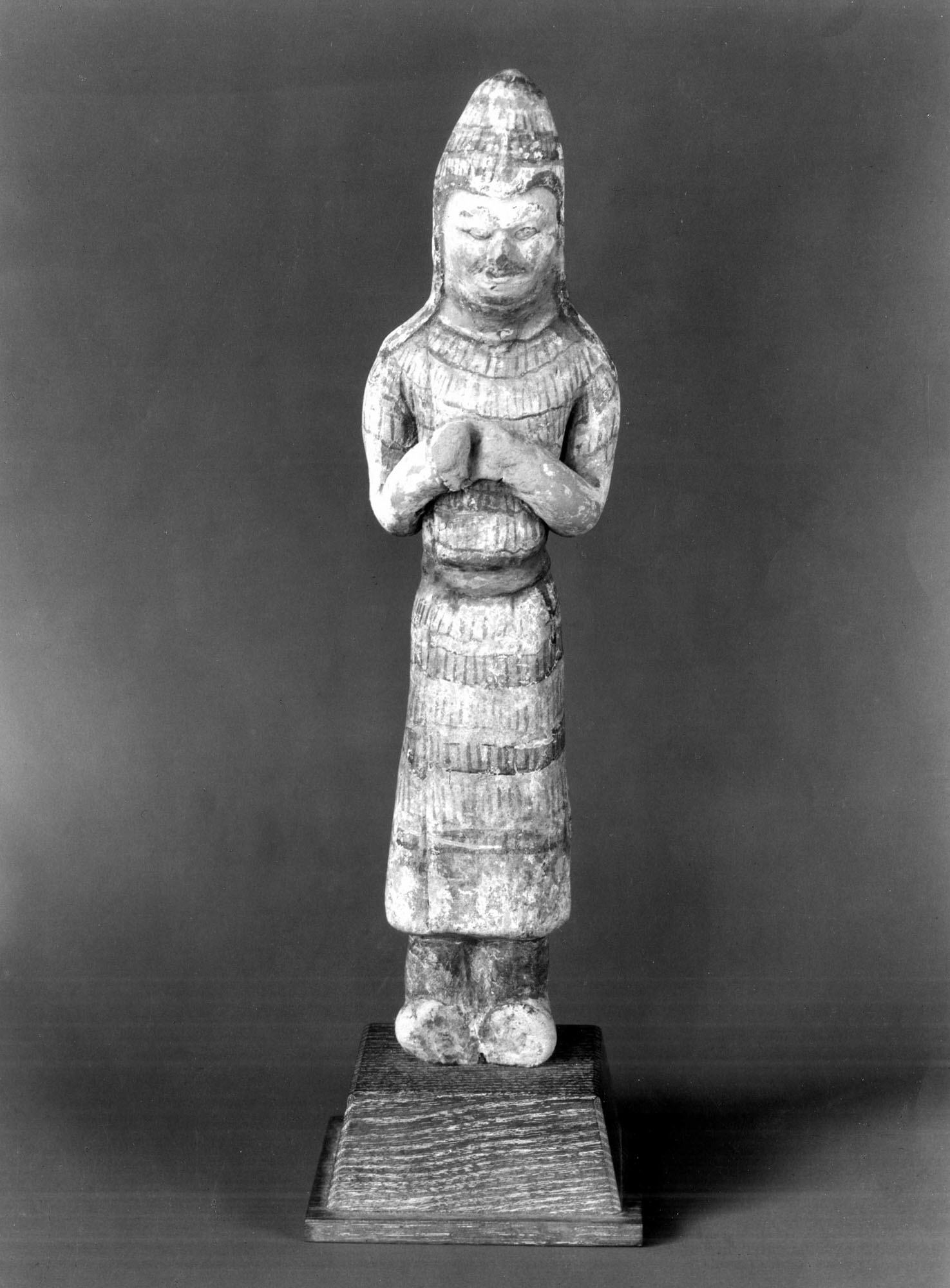
Tang soldier in lamellar armour

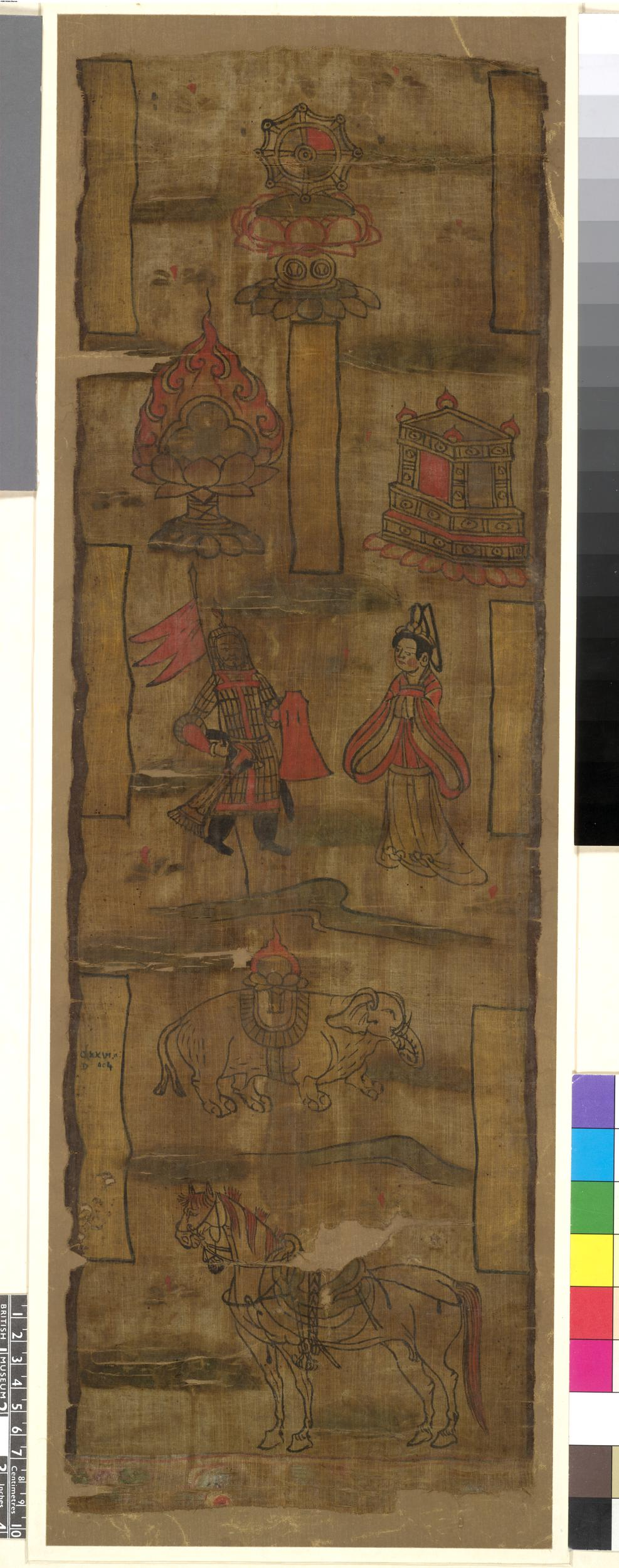
A Tang general as one of the Seven Buddhist Treasures

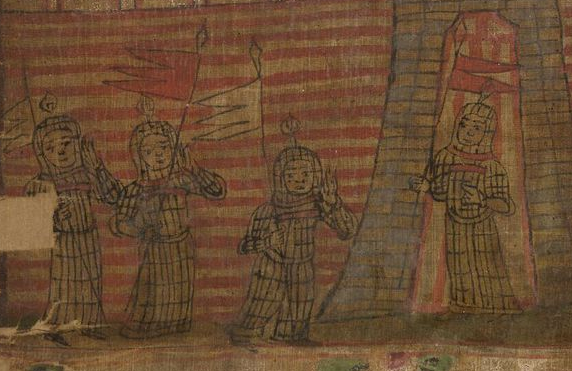
Tang soldiers in a mural.

=== Mail armour ===
Mail was already known to the Chinese since they first encountered it in 384 CE when their allies in the nation of Kuchi arrived wearing "armor similar to chains". However they did not procure a suit of mail until 718 CE when Central Asians presented to the Tang emperor a coat of "link armour". Mail was never used in any significant numbers (typically belonging to high ranks and those who could afford it) and the dominant form of armour continued to be lamellar.

=== Mountain pattern armour ===
Mountain pattern armour called "Tang beast armour" (tang ni kai)

Mountain pattern shoulder guard

References to mountain pattern armour (Chinese: 山文铠; pinyin: shānwénkǎi) appear as early as the Tang dynasty, but historical texts provide no explanation or diagram of how it actually worked. There are also no surviving examples of it. Everything that is known about mountain pattern armour comes from paintings and statues, typically of the Song and Ming periods. It is not unique to China and has been found in depictions in Korea, Vietnam, Japan, and even Thailand, but non-religious depictions are limited to only China, Korea, and Vietnam. Reconstruction projects of this type of armour have largely failed to produce good results.

The current theory is that this type of armour is made from a multitude of small pieces of iron or steel shaped like the Chinese character for the word "mountain" (山). The pieces are interlocked and riveted to a cloth or leather backing. It covers the torso, shoulders and thighs while remaining comfortable and flexible enough to allow movement. Also during this time, senior Chinese officers used mirror armour (Chinese: 护心镜; pinyin: hùxīnjìng) to protect important body parts, while cloth, leather, lamellar, and/or Mountain pattern armor were used for other body parts. This overall design was called "shining armor" (Chinese: 明光甲; pinyin: míngguāngjiǎ).

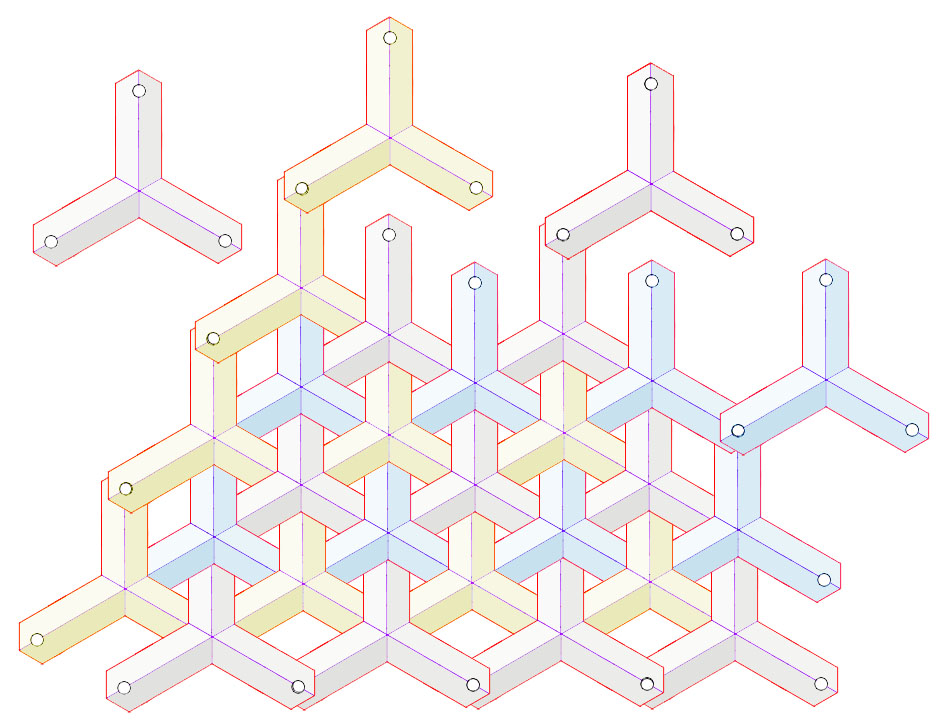
Scale armor with overlapping star-shaped pieces

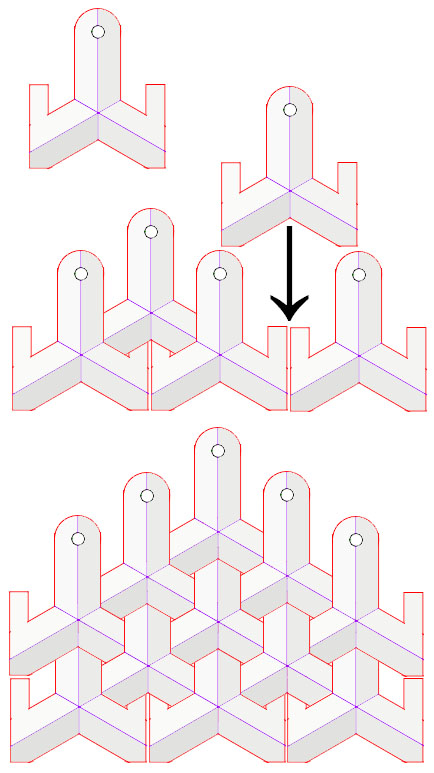
Scale armor with interlocking mountain-shaped pieces

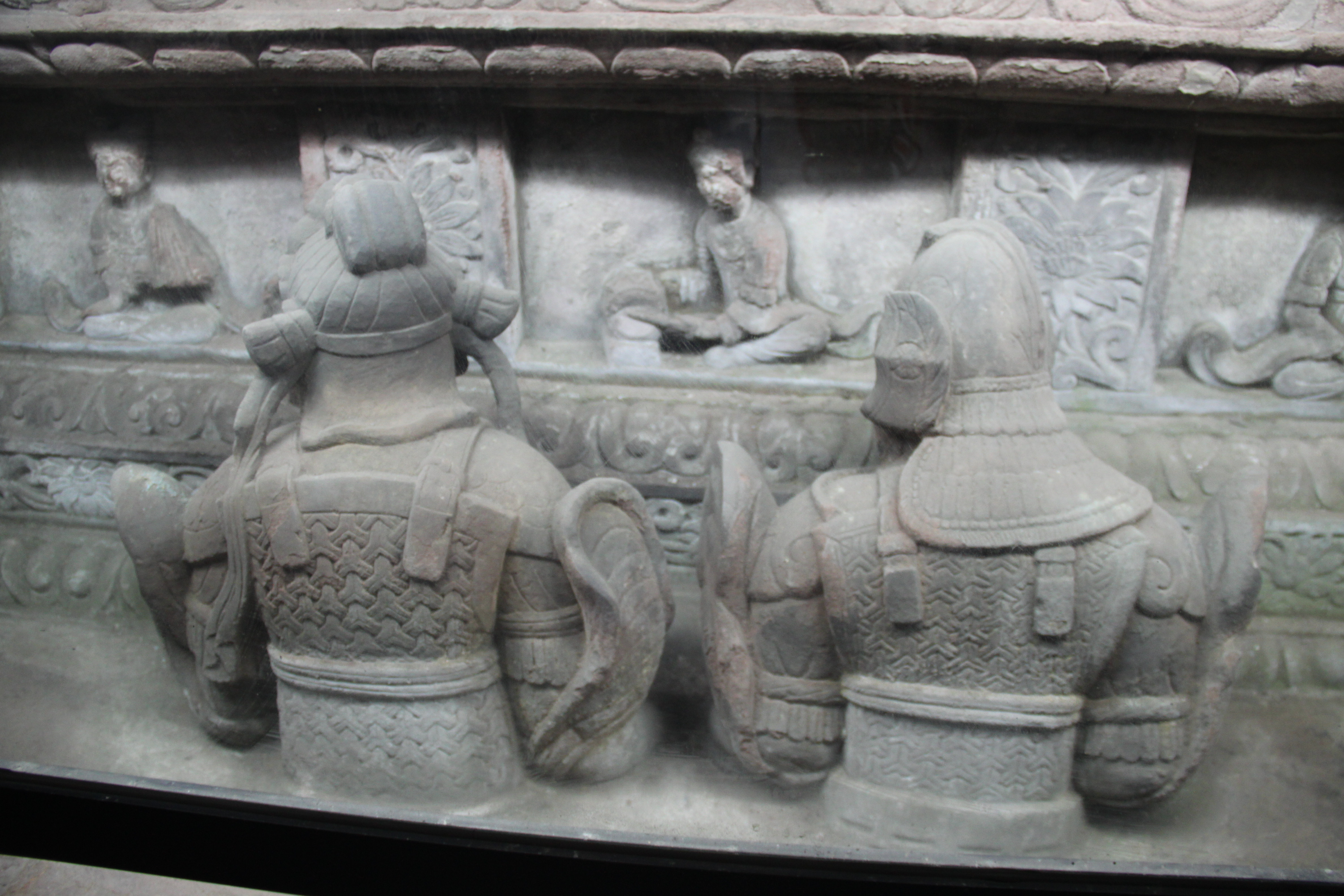
Tang tomb guardians wearing mountain pattern armour

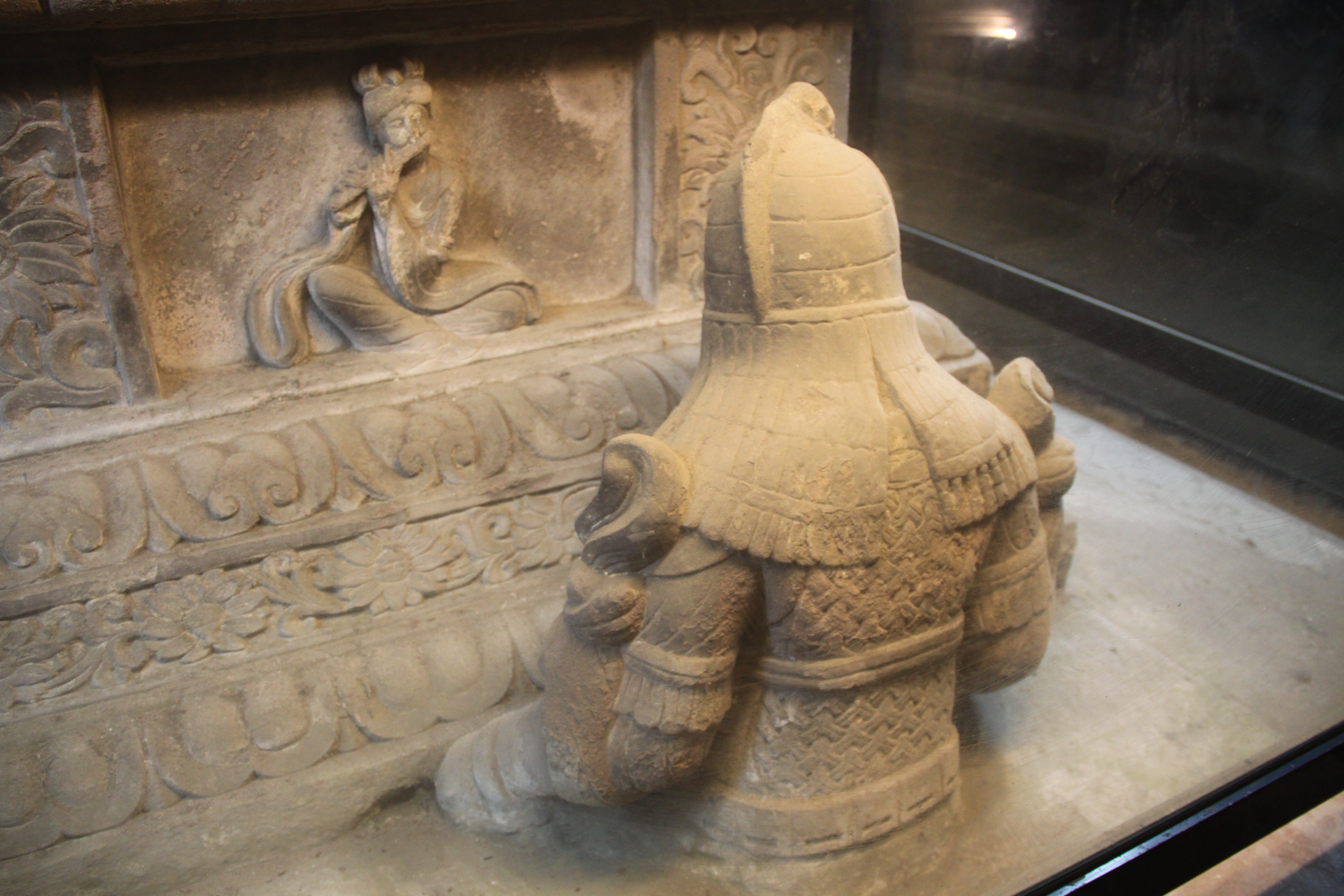
Tang tomb guardian with mountain pattern armour

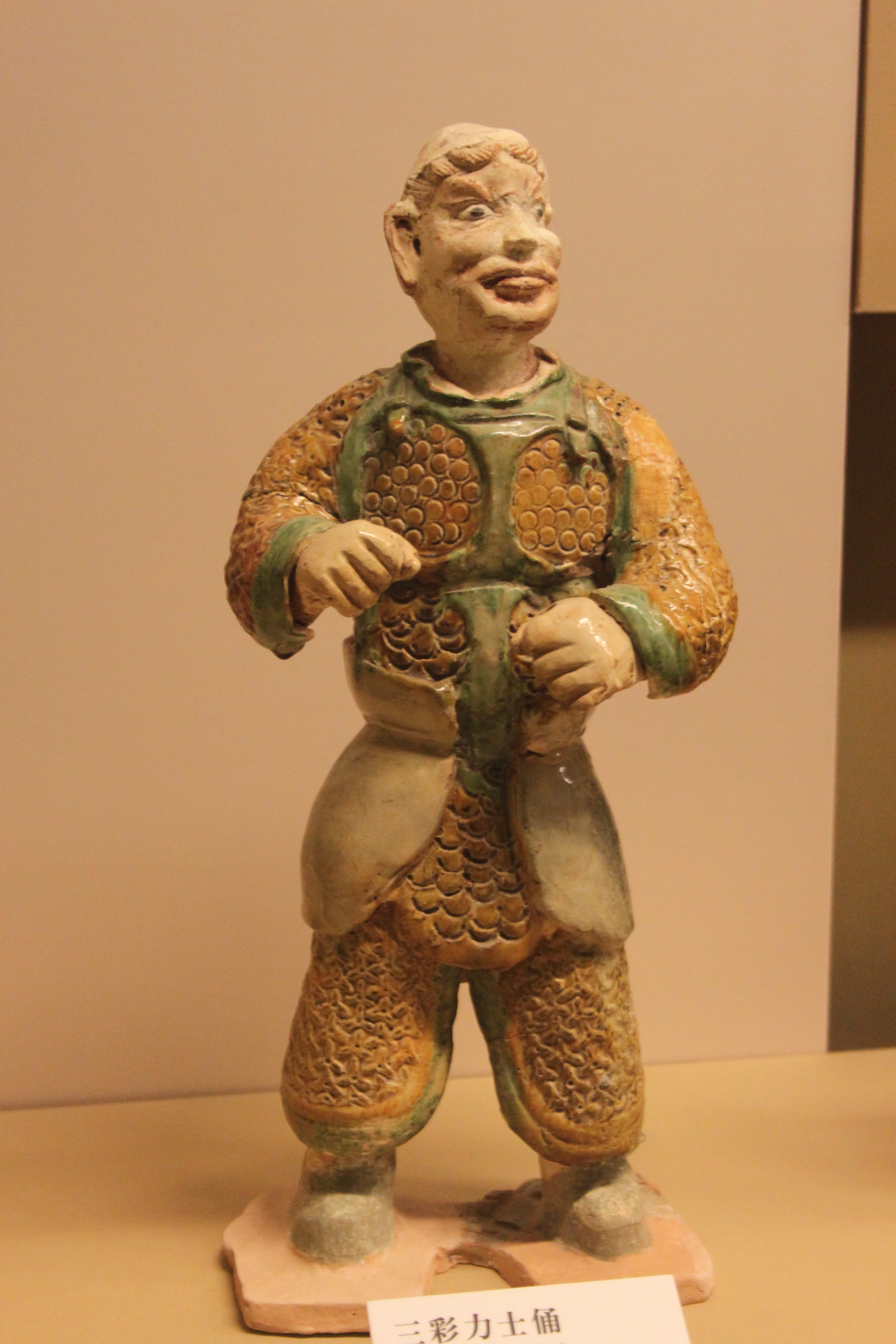
Tang soldier wearing a combination of mail, cord and plaque, and mountain pattern armour.

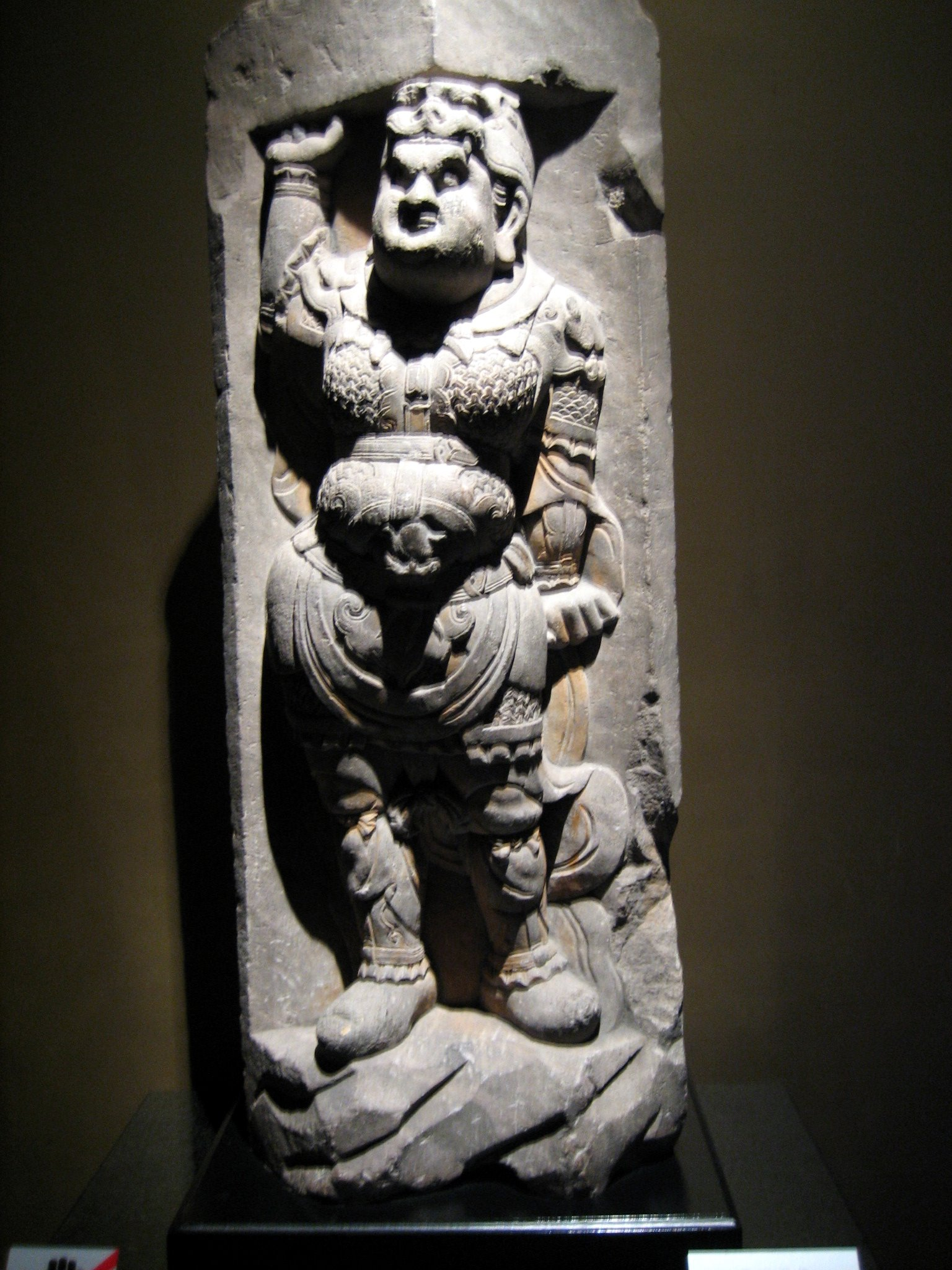
Tang stone relief depicting mountain pattern armour

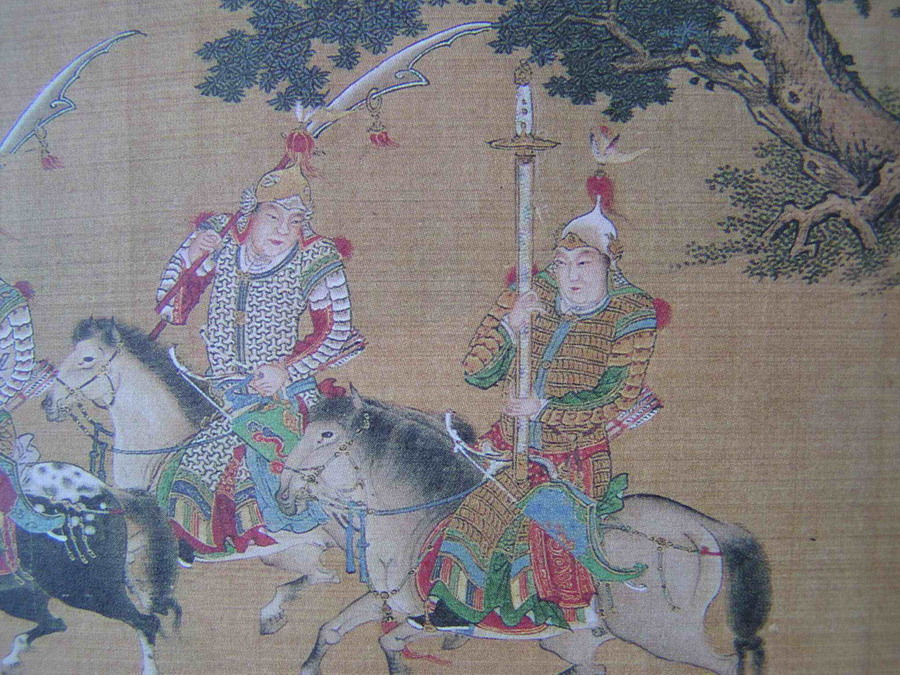
Close up view of the Ming dynasty painting "Departure Herald" showing riders wearing lamellar and mountain pattern armour

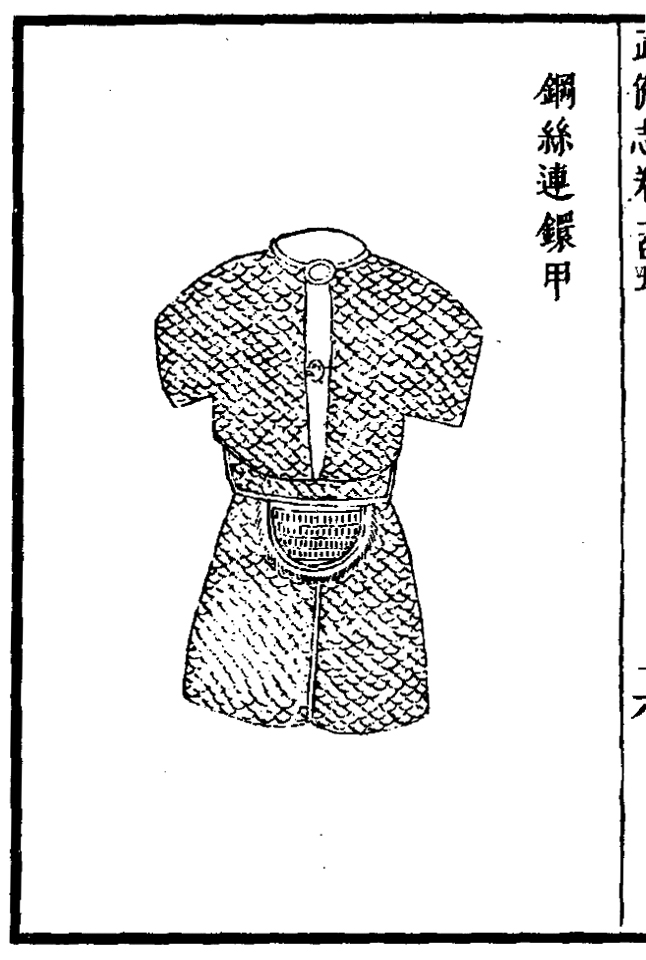
Ming depiction of mail armour - it looks like scale, but this was a common artistic convention. The text says "steel wire connecting ring armour."

=== Dao (saber) ===
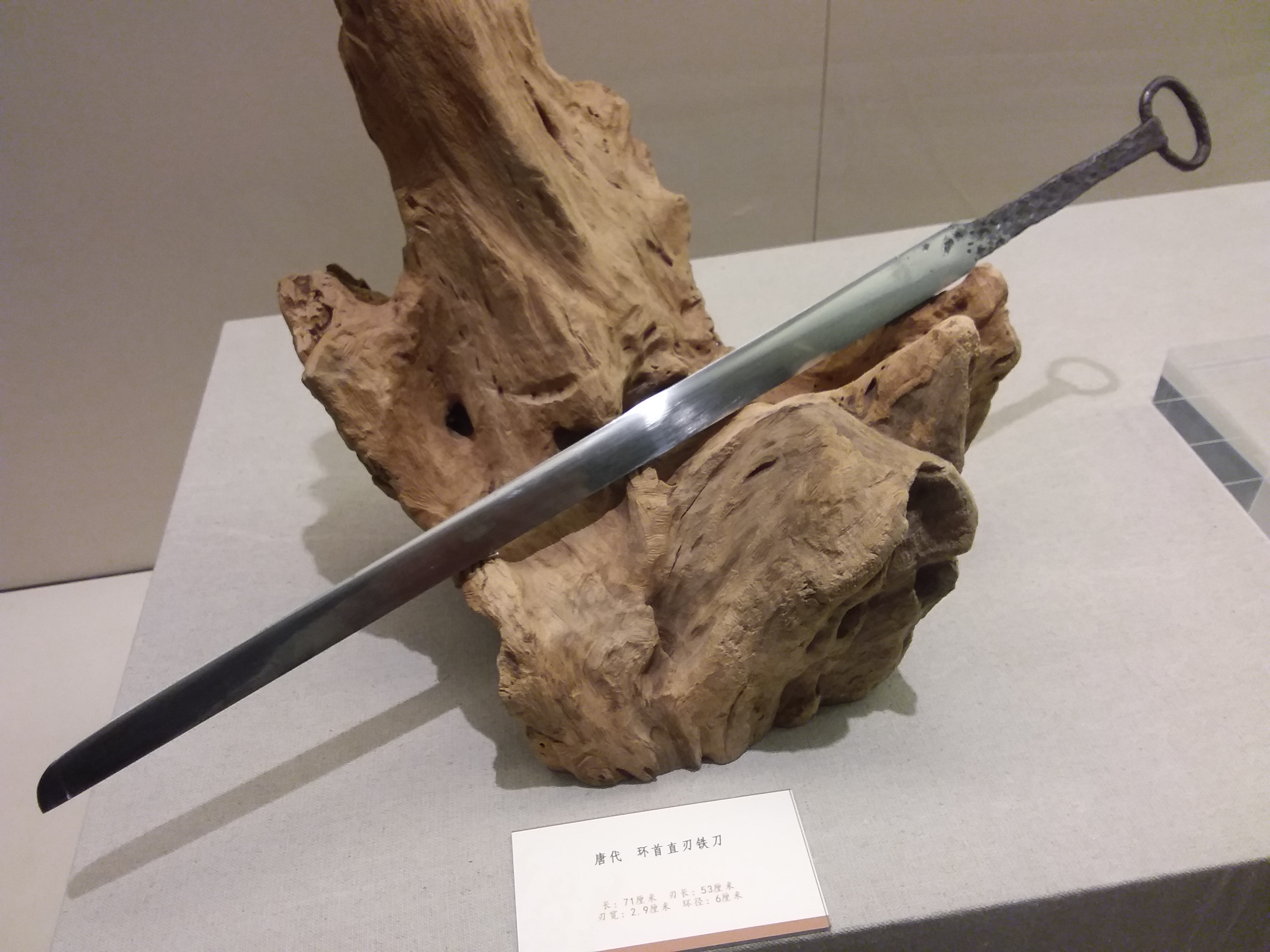
Dao with ring pommel, length: 71cm, Tang dynasty

The dao, a single edged blade (saber), was separated into four categories during the Tang dynasty. These were the Ceremonial Dao, Defense Dao, Cross Dao, and Divided Dao. The Ceremonial Dao was a court item usually decorated with gold and silver. It was also known as the "Imperial Sword". The Defense Dao does not have any specifications but its name is self-explanatory. The Cross Dao was a waist weapon worn on the belt, hence its older name, the Belt Dao. It was often carried as a sidearm by crossbowmen. The Divided Dao, also called a Long Dao (long saber), was a cross between a polearm and a saber. It consisted of a 91 cm blade fixed to a long 120 cm handle ending in an iron butt point, although exceptionally large weapons reaching 3 meters in length and weighing 10.2 kg have been mentioned. Divided daos were wielded by elite Tang vanguard forces and used to spearhead attacks.

In one army, there are 12,500 officers and men. Ten thousand men in eight sections bearing Belt Daos; Two thousand five hundred men in two sections with Divided Daos.

— Taibai Yinjing

=== Crossbow ===
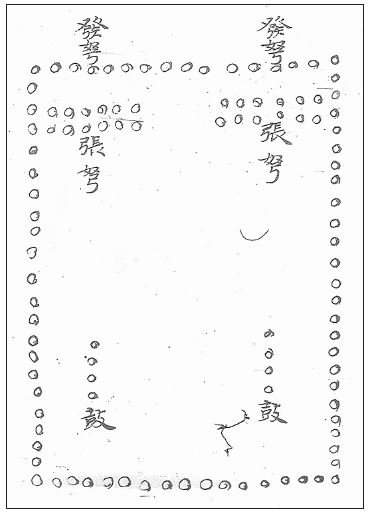
Illustration of a rectangular Tang volley fire formation using crossbows. From Li Quan 李筌, Shen ji zhi di tai bai yin jing 神機制敵太白陰經, ca. 759.

After the Han dynasty, the crossbow lost favor until it experienced a mild resurgence during the Tang dynasty, under which the ideal expeditionary army of 20,000 included 2,200 archers and 2,000 crossbowmen. Li Jing and Li Quan prescribed 20 percent of the infantry to be armed with standard crossbows, which could hit the target half the time at a distance of 345 meters, but had an effective range of 225 meters. Spearmen were all supposed to carry a bow and crossbowmen to be armed with halberds for self-defense, but it's not clear how well this worked in practice.

During the An Lushan Rebellion the Tang general Li Guangbi successfully deployed a spear crossbow formation against the rebel cavalry forces under Shi Siming. In 756 Shi Siming raced ahead of the main army with his mounted troops to intercept Li Guangbi's Shuofang army near the town of Changshan. Li took Changshan in advance and set up his men with their backs to the town walls to prevent a sneak attack. The spearmen formed a dense defensive formation while 1,000 crossbowmen divided into four sections to provide continuous volley fire. When Shi's cavalry engaged Li's Shuofang army they were completely unable to close in on his troops and suffered heavy losses, forcing a withdrawal.

The concept of continuous and concerted rotating fire, the countermarch, may have been implemented using crossbows as early as the Han dynasty, but it was not until the Tang dynasty that illustrations of the countermarch appeared. The 759 CE text, Tai bai yin jing (太白陰經) by Tang military official Li Quan (李筌), contains the oldest known depiction and description of the volley fire technique. The illustration shows a rectangular crossbow formation with each circle representing one man. In the front is a line labeled "shooting crossbows" (發弩) and behind that line are rows of crossbowmen, two facing right and two facing left, and they are labeled "loading crossbows" (張弩). The commander (大將軍) is situated in the middle of the formation and to his right and left are vertical rows of drummers (鼓) who coordinate the firing and reloading procedure in procession: who loaded their weapons, stepped forward to the outer ranks, shot, and then retired to reload. According to Li Quan, "the classics say that the crossbow is fury. It is said that its noise is so powerful that it sounds like fury, and that's why they named it this way," and by using the volley fire method there is no end to the sound and fury, and the enemy is unable to approach. Here he is referring to the word for "crossbow" nu which is also a homophone for the word for fury, nu.

The encyclopedic text known as the Tongdian by Du You from 801 CE also provides a description of the volley fire technique: "[Crossbow units] should be divided into teams that can concentrate their arrow shooting.... Those in the center of the formations should load [their bows] while those on the outside of the formations should shoot. They take turns, revolving and returning, so that once they've loaded they exit [i.e., proceed to the outer ranks] and once they've shot they enter [i.e., go within the formations]. In this way, the sound of the crossbow will not cease and the enemy will not harm us."

Large mounted crossbows known as "bed crossbows" were used as early as the Warring States period. Mozi described them as defensive weapons placed on top the battlements. The Mohist siege crossbow was described as humongous device with frameworks taller than a man and shooting arrows with cords attached so that they could be pulled back. By the Han dynasty, crossbows were used as mobile field artillery and known as "Military Strong Carts". Around the 5th century AD, multiple bows were combined to increase draw weight and length, thus creating the double and triple bow crossbows. Tang versions of this weapon are stated to have obtained a range of 1,160 yards, which is supported by Ata-Malik Juvayni on the use of similar weapons by the Mongols in 1256. According Juvayni, Hulagu Khan brought with him 3,000 giant crossbows from China, for the siege of Nishapur, and a team of Chinese technicians to work a great 'ox bow' shooting large bolts a distance of 2,500 paces, which was used at the siege of Maymun Diz. Constructing these weapons, especially the casting of the large triggers, and their operation required the highest order of technical expertise available at the time. They were primarily used from the 8th to 11th centuries.

== Transition from Sui to Tang ==
After failing to defeat Goguryeo several times over, the Sui dynasty (581-618) erupted into war among several competing factions. By the summer of 618, there emerged nine major contenders for power:

- Dou Jiande, "King of Changle/Xia", who occupied central Hebei
- Du Fuwei, occupied the region between the Huai River and the Changjiang
- Li Mi, "Duke of Wei", who occupied Henan
- Li Yuan, "Emperor of Tang", who occupied Taiyuan and Chang'an
- Liang Shidu, "Emperor of Liang", who occupied Shuofang Commandery
- Liu Wuzhou, who occupied Mayi Commandery
- Wang Shichong, who occupied Luoyang
- Xiao Xian, "Emperor of Liang", who occupied the region south of the Changjiang
- Xue Ju, "Hegemon King of Western Qin", who occupied eastern Gansu

=== Battle of Yanshi (618) ===
Li Mi advanced on Wang Shichong in Luoyang in 618. On 4 October, Wang Shichong sortied out with 20,000 of his elite troops and bypassed Li Mi's forward positions. He advanced deep into enemy territory and engaged with Li's 40,000 strong army the next day. Wang sent several hundred cavalry across the canal to skirmish with Li's general Shan Xiongxin while he built bridges to cross the canal. The two sides disengaged when night set in, but Wang deployed his forces in the darkness and set up offensive formations near the enemy camp. When Li's camp became aware this, they tried to set up defensive positions, but it was already too late. Wang's army struck them before they had finished deploying while horsemen set fire to their tents. Li escaped with 10,000 men and fled to Li Yuan in the west. His forces were either killed or surrendered to Wang Shichong.

=== Battle of Qianshuiyuan (618) ===
On 6 August 618, Xue Ju inflicted a serious defeat on Tang forces at the first battle of Qianshuiyuan, forcing them back to Chang'an. The Tang general, Li Shimin, returned in September, at which point Xue Ju had already died. His son Xue Rengao was now in command. From the fortified camp near Gaozhe, Li sent small units to skirmish with the enemy but refused to commit his whole army to battle. After some sixty days, Xue's army ran out of supplies and his generals started defecting to the Tang side. At this point, Li sent out two detachments in succession to lure out the enemy army. While Xue's army was engaged with the vanguard detachments, Li attacked with the rest of the army from another direction. The result was complete victory and Xue Rengao's surrender on 30 November.

=== Du Fuwei (619) ===
Du Fuwei surrendered to the Tang in 619.

=== Battle of Jiexiu (619–620) ===
Liu Wuzhou and his general Song Jin'gang attacked Taiyuan and the Fen River valley in late autumn of 619. Li Shimin countered them by building a strong fortified camp at Bobi. Li avoided any major confrontations, and like the previous battle at Qianshuiyuan, he sent out small units to skirmish with the enemy. After a confrontation lasting several months, the Liu army under Song ran out of supplies. In the middle of May 620, Li gave chase and demolished the opposing force in a piecemeal fashion, taking them apart from 21 May to 1 June. In the final battle, Li sent troops to pin the left and right flanks before driving his elite cavalry into the center line for a decisive blow. Liu Wuzhou fled to the Türks.

=== Battle of Hulao (621) ===
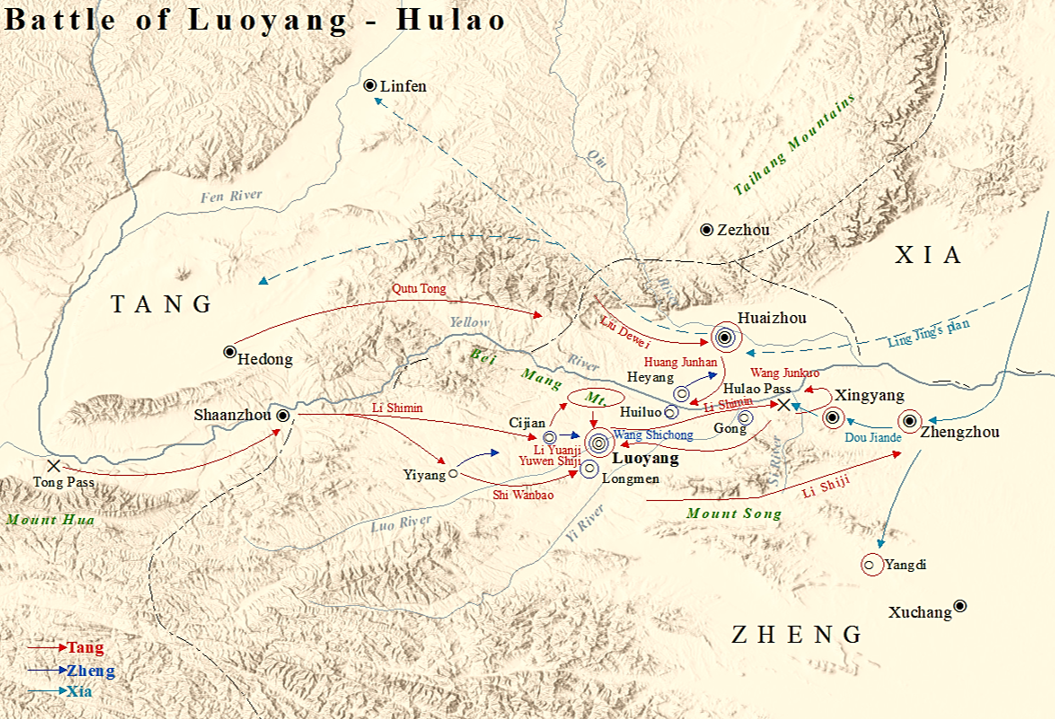
Battle of Hulao

Li Shimin began his advance on Wang Shichong's Luoyang in August 620 with 50,000 men. By the end of the month he had fortified the hills approaching Luoyang and territories to its north and south. He also occupied the strategic pass of Huanyuan, triggering a number of defections from Henan to the Tang side, reducing Wang's territory to just Luoyang, Xiangyang, and Xuzhou. Li defeated Wang's army several times outside the walls of Luoyang and enacted a blockade on the city. By the spring of 621, the inhabitants of Luoyang had been reduced to starvation and cannibalism. Wang tried to make a break for it on 11 March, but failed and lost several thousand men.

Meanwhile, Dou Jiande saw an opportunity to defeat both the Tang army and eliminate Wang Shichong at the same time. In April 621, Dou marched for Luoyang with 100,000 soldiers. Li Shimin broke off from the main army with a light column to block Dou's advance at Hulao Pass. Li occupied the towns and hills above the pass and refused to engage with the enemy army. In late May, Li sent cavalry forces to raid Dou's supply line. Dou responded with an attack on Hulao Pass on 28 May. He deployed his army in front of the Yellow River facing the enemy position and the two sides sent cavalry to skirmish in the early morning. Dou's army wavered at the sight of a strong cavalry offensive and attempted to withdraw to a more defensible position. Seeing weakness in the enemy lines, Li personally charged in with a detachment of light cavalry and cut off their retreat. The main body of the Tang army followed up and collapsed on the opposing force. Dou was injured by a lance and captured. Wang Shichong surrendered on 3 June.

=== Battle of Jiangling (621) ===
Beginning in 620, Tang forces under Li Xiaogong made preparations for an invasion of Xiao Xian's territory. Together with Li Jing, Li Xiaogong launched a river campaign in the autumn of 621. They defeated the Xiao fleet at the mouth of the Qing River and proceeded to defeat the Xiao army outside the walls of Jiangling. Xiao Xian capitulated on 10 November.

=== Rebellions (621–624) ===
When Dou Jiande was executed in June 621, his former generals elected Liu Heita as their leader and rebelled. Xu Yuanlang, a Shandong bandit chief also joined them in rebellion. They were both defeated by spring of 623. Du Fuwei's lieutenant Fu Gongshi also rebelled. He was crushed in the spring of 624.

Every time that Dou Jiande was successful in battle or in capturing a city, the treasures he received were all divided for the soldiers, and he did not personally take anything. His daily life was frugal and simple. He did not feast on meat, instead eating vegetables and unrefined grain. His wife, Lady Cao, wore only cloth, not silk, and had less than ten servant girls.

— Old Book of Tang

== Göktürks ==
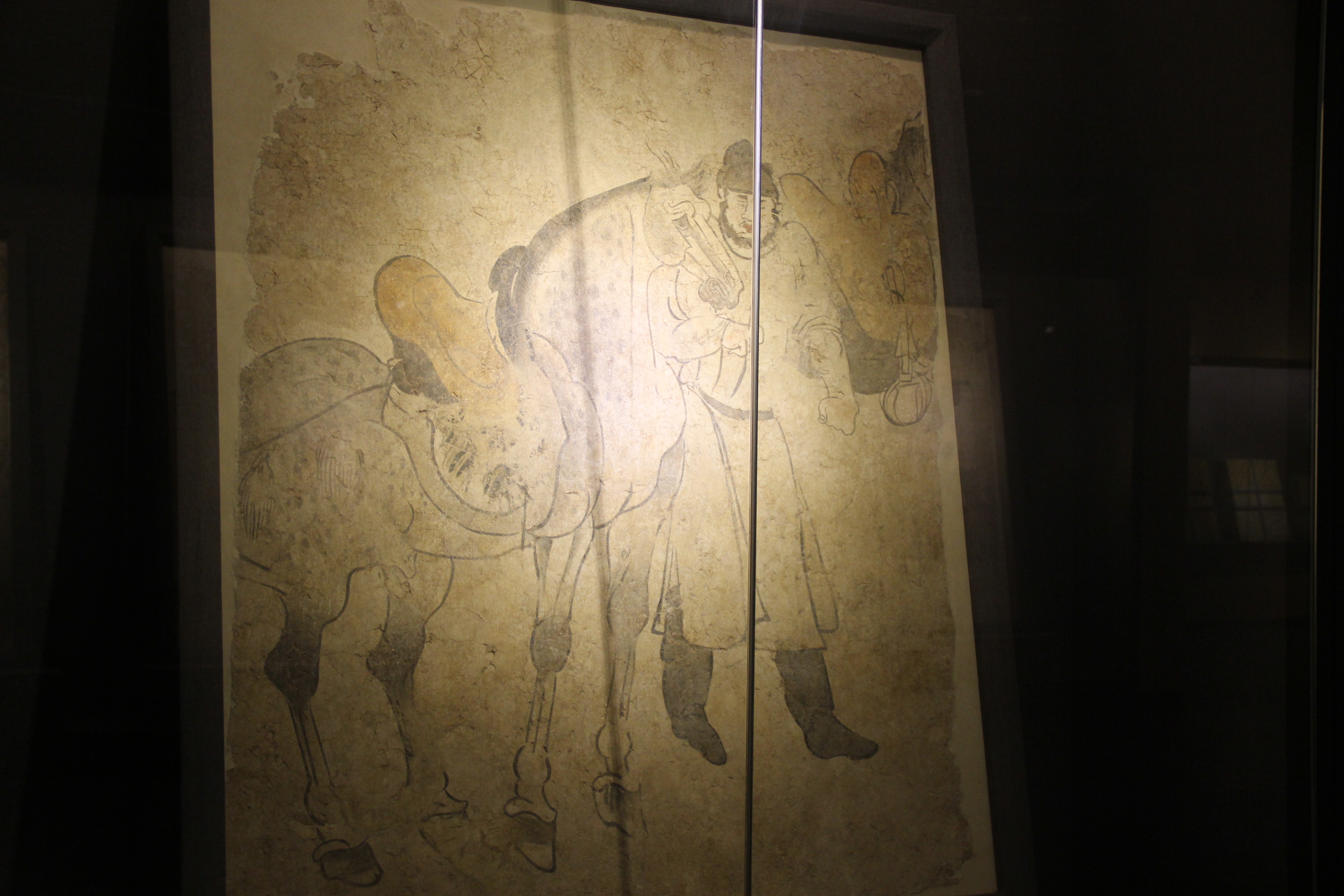
Tang horse handler and his horse

=== Eastern Turkic Khaganate (623–630) ===
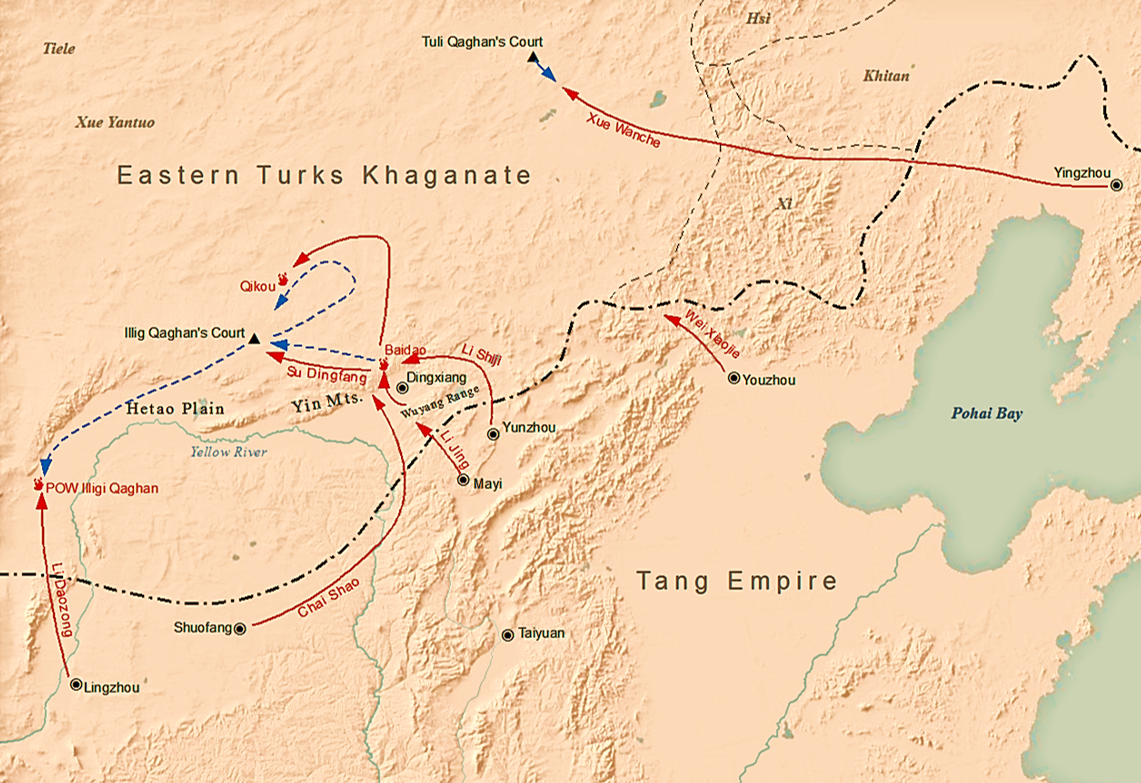
Tang campaign against the Eastern Turks (629–630)

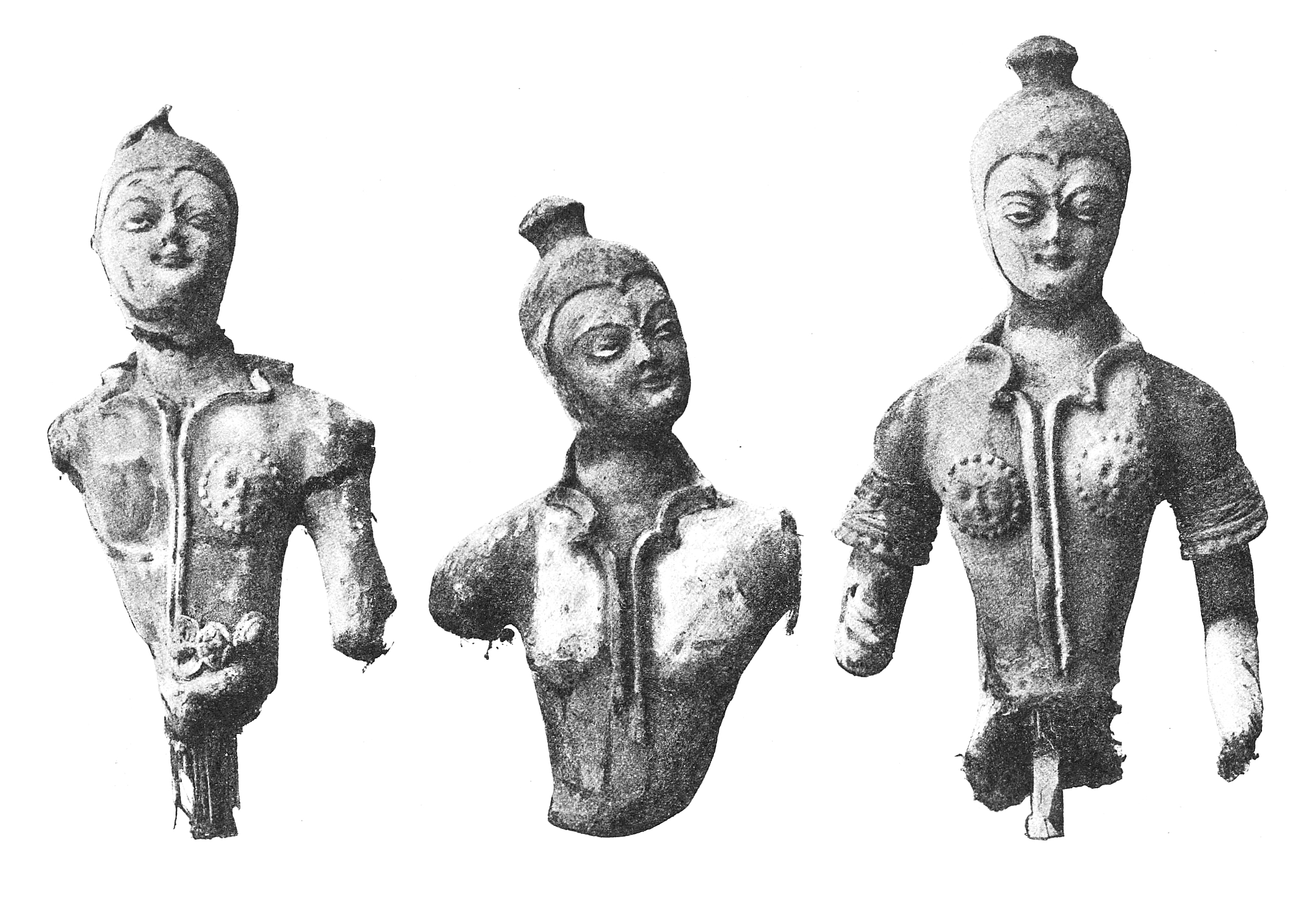
Turkic warrior figurines from the Kizil Caves

From 623 to 626, Illig Qaghan carried out raids across the northern Tang frontier. In 624, Illig and his nephew Ashina Shibobi planned on a major invasion of the Tang, but Li Shimin convinced Shibobi not to invade, so the campaign ground to a halt. In 626, only a few weeks after Emperor Taizong of Tang took power, the Türks approached the northern bank of the Wei River, near Chang'an. On 23 September, Taizong agreed to a payment of tribute to the Eastern Turkic Khaganate.

In 628, an ally of the Turks, Liang Shidu, was killed by his cousin who surrendered to the Tang.

Preparations for a campaign against the Eastern Turkic Khaganate were completed by the autumn of 629. Emperor Taizong of Tang contacted the Xueyantuo north of the Gobi Desert and made an alliance with them.

On 11 September, Li Jing was appointed commander-in-chief of the expeditionary army. On 13 December, he commenced the offensive operation.

Six Tang armies marched against the Eastern Turks. Li Jing marched north from Mayi toward Dingxiang, where Illig Qaghan was encamped. Li Jing occupied the ridge south of Dingxiang with 3,000 light cavalry. At night, the Tang forces attacked Dingxiang and penetrated the outer wall, forcing Illig to flee north to a place called Iron Mountain. Meanwhile, Li Shiji's forces joined Li Jing at Baidao Pass.

Illig tried to sue for peace. As negotiations were underway, Li Jing and Li Shiji made a surprise attack on Illig's camp on 27 March 630. The Türks were caught unaware and a one sided massacre ensued where some 10,000 Türks were killed. Illig was able to escape but was later caught and handed over to Tang officers on 12 May 630. The surrendered Türks were settled on the marginal borderlands of the Tang between them and the Xueyantuo. A hundred or so Türks were made generals of the Tang army.

=== 1st Xueyantuo (641–646) ===
In 641, Li Shiji inflicted a major defeat on the Xueyantuo at Nuozhen River.

In 646, the Xueyantuo were defeated and submitted to the Tang.

=== 1st Western Turkic Khaganate (651–652) ===
In the winter of 651, the Tang sent 30,000 soldiers and 50,000 Uyghur cavalrymen against the Western Turkic Khaganate. In 652, they were intercepted by the Chuyue, who were vassals of the Western Turks, and defeated them. The Tang army established prefectures in present-day Fukang and Miquan before returning home due to a shortage of provisions.

=== 2nd Western Turkic Khaganate (656–657) ===
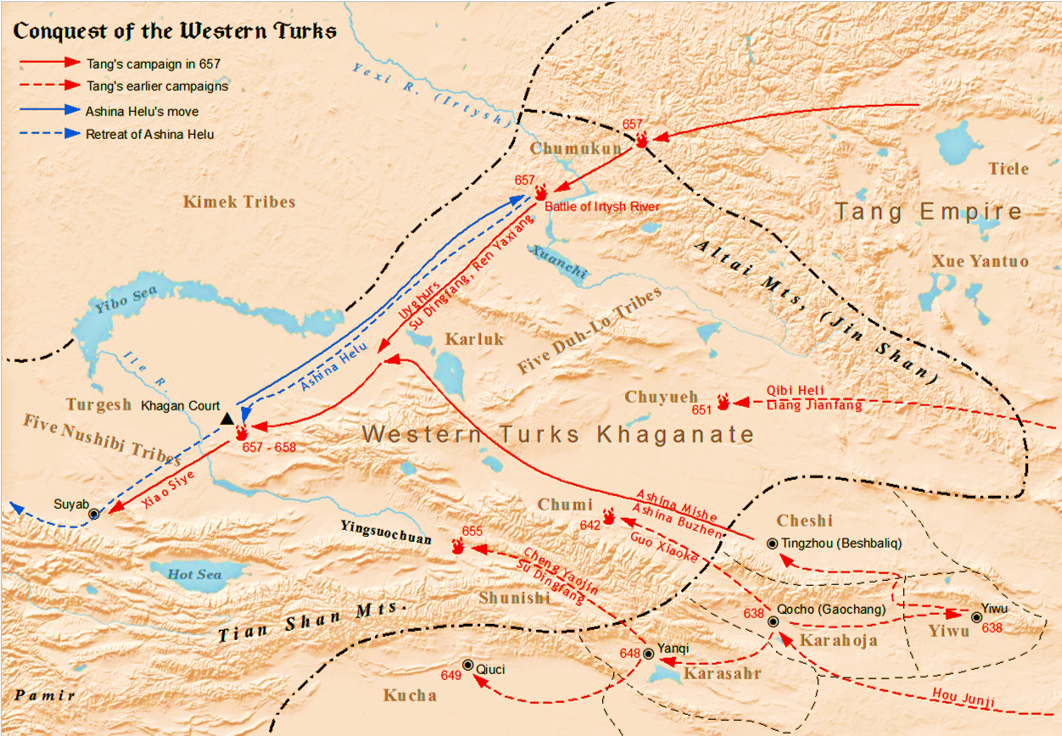
Conquest of the Western Turks and the Western Regions, 638–658

In the winter of 656, the Tang army set off to defeat the Western Turkic Khaganate. In the fall of 657, they defeated the Chuyue and Karluks subordinate to the Western Turks at Yumugu (nearly present day Urumqi). After securing a victory against the Western Turks at Yingsuo River, the two commanders in charge of the Tang forces got into an argument over their next course of action. They eventually agreed on organizing their troops into a tight formation for better protection, but the delay made it impossible for them to find and engage Ashina Helu's main forces, and the expedition ended inconclusively.

Another expedition was dispatched under the leadership of Su Dingfang, Ashina Mishe, and Ashina Buzhen. The Tang generals convinced Axijie, leader of the strongest tribe under Ashina Helu's command, to defect by releasing his tribesmen captured in previous campaigns. Su Dingfang defeated the Chuyue and convinced the Turgesh to surrender. He engaged Ashina Helu's main army at the Battle of Irtysh River. Ashina Helu encircled Su's army and attacked the infantry first, but the Tang soldiers stood their ground and used their long spears to force back the enemy cavalry. Su then counterattacked, killing tens of thousands of Türks. Ashina Helu fled and the Tang army chased after him. After meeting up with the southern army, the combined Tang army made a final attack on Ashina Helu's camp, but he managed to escape again. Ashina Helu's retinue reached Shiguo before being captured by the locals who handed them over to the Tang. Ashina Helu was brought back to Chang'an in 658, where he was pardoned, but died soon after anyway.

=== Ashina Duzhi (677–679) ===
In 677, Ashina Duzhi rebelled and allied himself to the Tibetan Empire. In 679, Pei Xingjian attacked Ashina Duzhi at Suiye (Tokmak) and defeated him. Suiye was turned into a Tang garrison

=== Ashina Nishufu (679–680) ===
In 679, Ashina Nishufu rebelled on the northern border of Hedong (Shanxi). They were defeated by Pei Xingjian in 680.

=== Ashina Funian (680) ===
In 680, Ashina Funian rebelled, but he eventually surrendered and was executed in Chang'an.

=== 1st Second Turkic Khaganate (681–687) ===
In 681, Ilterish Qaghan rebelled with the remnants of Ashina Funian's followers and declared the Second Turkic Khaganate in 682. The Second Turks conducted annual raids on Tang territory until 687.

=== 2nd Second Turkic Khaganate (693–702) ===
The Second Turkic Khaganate conducted regular raids from 693 to 702 under Qapaghan Qaghan until Wu Zetian accepted his marriage proposal in 703.

=== 3rd Second Turkic Khaganate (706–707) ===
The Second Turkic Khaganate conducted raids in 706 and 707.

=== 4th Second Turkic Khaganate (720) ===
In 720, Bilge Khagan of the Second Turkic Khaganate invaded and extracted tribute. A Tang, Basmyl, Khitan counterattack was defeated.

== Turgesh ==
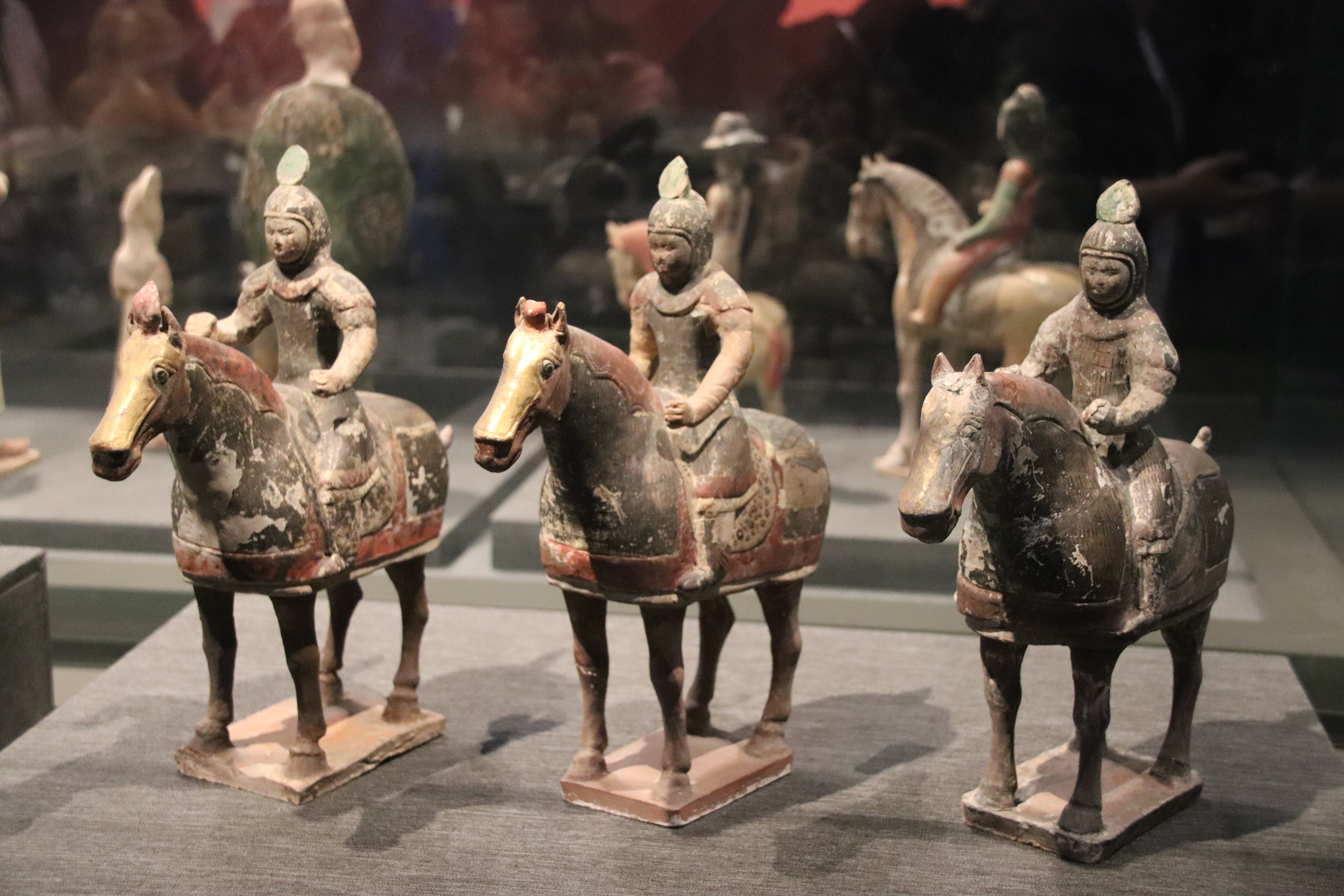
Armoured cavalry figurines, Tang dynasty

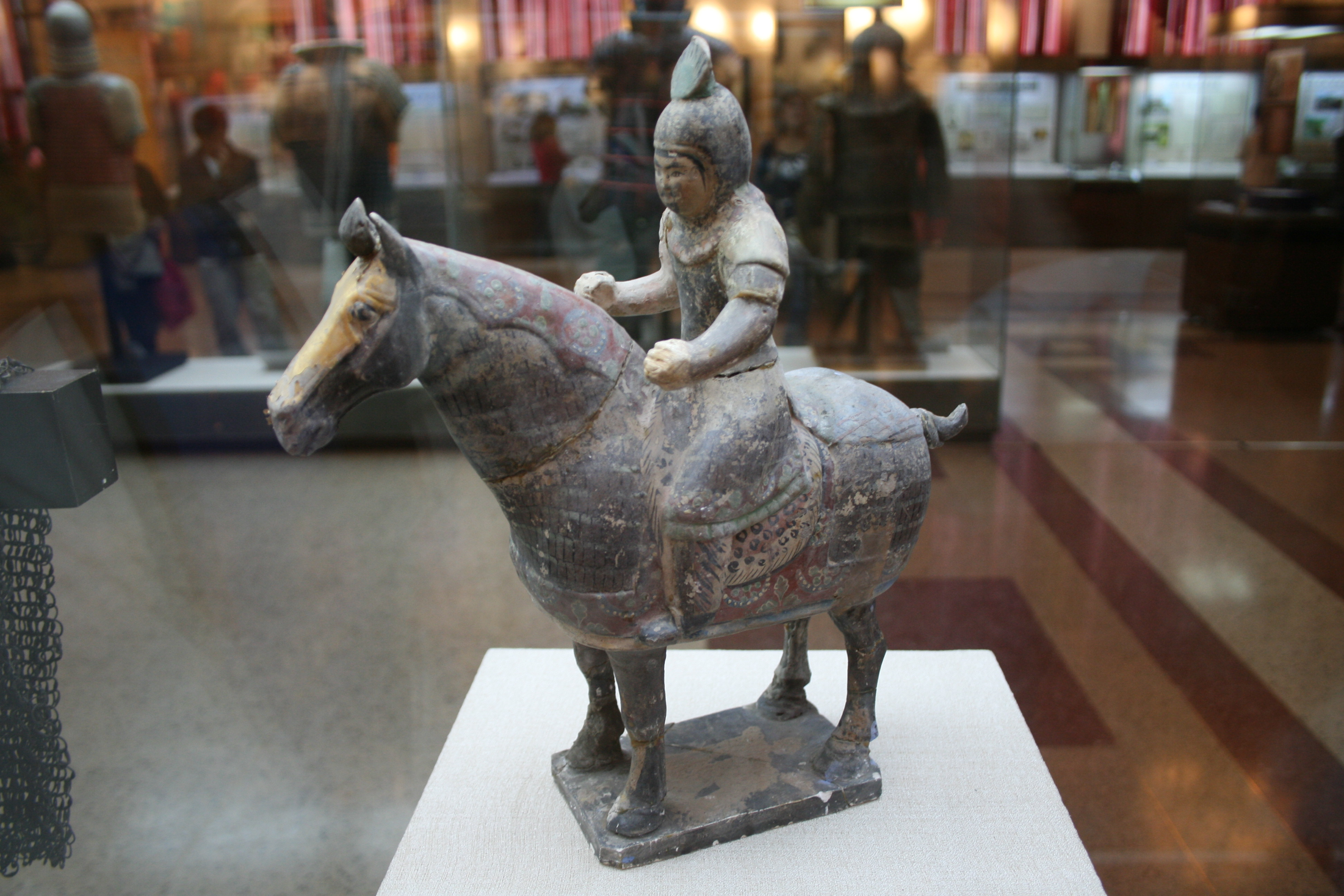
Tang cavalry tomb figurine

In 703, the Turgesh seized Suiye.

In 708, the Turgesh attacked Qiuci and in 709, defeated a Tang army.

On 15 August 717, a Turgesh led army of Tibetans and Arabs laid siege to Uch Turfan and Gumo. General Tang Jiahui defeated them. The Arab general Al-Yashkuri fled to Tashkent.

From 726 to 727, the Turgesh and Tibetan Empire attacked Qiuci.

In 735, the Turgesh attacked Tingzhou. The Tang counterattack defeated them in 737.

In 740, Kül-chor of the Turgesh submitted to the Tang dynasty but later rebelled anyway and was killed in 744.

In 748, the Tang recaptured Suiye and destroyed it.

In 750, the Turgesh rebelled along with Chach in modern Tashkent. They were defeated.

== Uyghurs ==
In 843, Shi Xiong attacked the Uyghurs displaced by the fall of their khaganate and slaughtered 10,000 Uyghurs at "Kill the Foreigners" Mountain (Shahu).

== Korea & Mohe ==
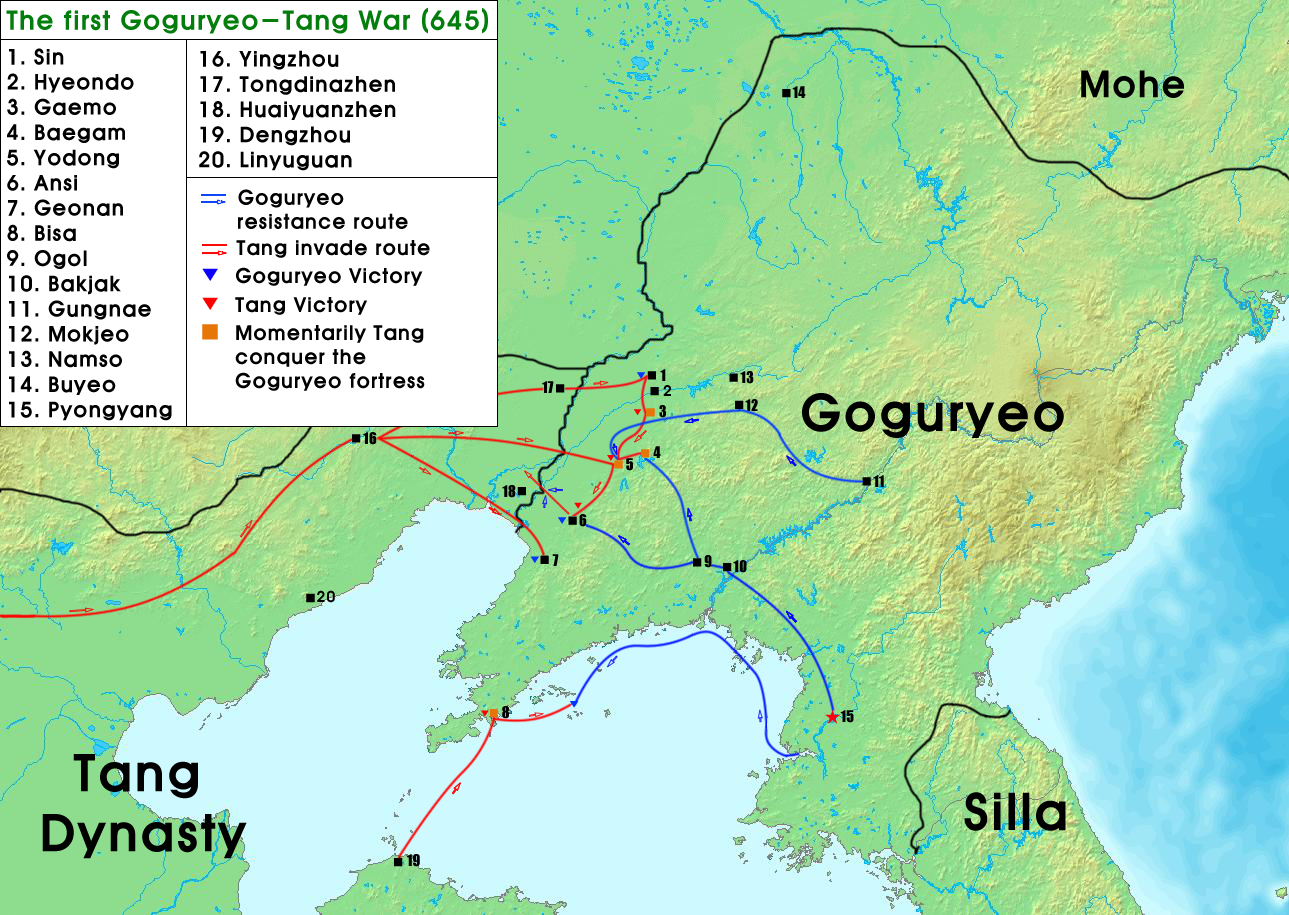
First conflict of the Goguryeo–Tang War

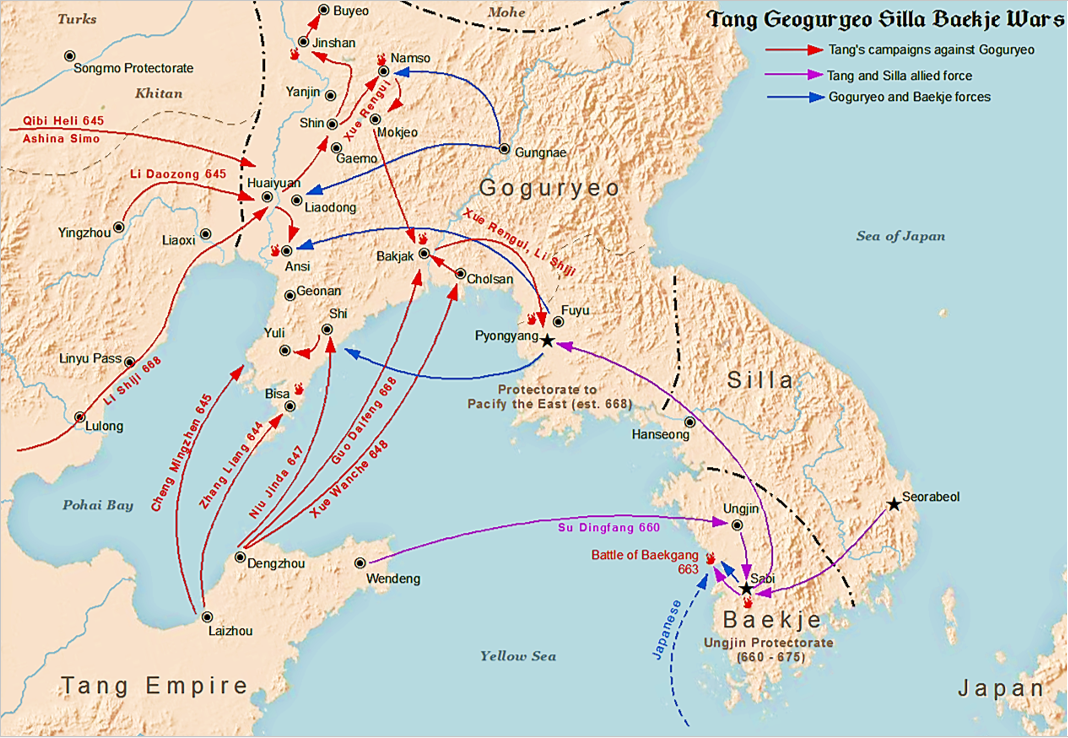
Tang-Korean wars

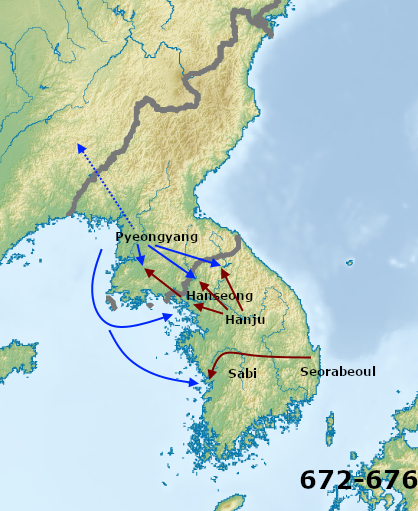
Silla-Tang War, 672-676

=== 1st Goguryeo (645) ===
Preparations for a campaign against Goguryeo began in 644. A fleet of 500 ships was constructed to transport 43,000 soldiers across the sea. On land, some 60,000 soldiers gathered at Youzhou under the command of Li Shiji.

Li Shiji's army set off from Yincheng (modern Chaoyang) in April 645. He laid siege to Gaemo on 16 May and captured it on 27 May. He then headed southwest and defeated a Goguryeo army of 40,000. Li Shiji was joined by the emperor with 10,000 heavy cavalry. They took Liaodong (Ryotong) on 16 June and Baekam on 27 June. When they reached Ansi City on 18 July, news reached them that a large Goguryeo-Mohe army was on its way. Taizong ordered Li Shiji to lure out the enemies with only 15,000 men while he himself ambushed them from the rear. The remaining enemies fled atop a hill where they were surrounded and forced to surrender, yielding 36,800 captives, 50,000 horses, 50,000 cattle, and 10,000 suits of iron armour. All the Mohe soldiers were put to death while the rest were freed.

Despite the initial success, the Tang expedition ground to a halt at Ansi, which refused to fall. The naval force took Bisa but failed to meet up with the land army or capture Pyeongyang. After the defenders at Ansi made a successful sortie to secure a strategic location in the southeastern corner of the city, Taizong called an end to the expedition and ordered a withdrawal on 13 October.

=== 2nd Goguryeo (647-648) ===
In 647, Emperor Taizong of Tang sent a naval force to harass the coast of Goguryeo while Li Shiji led 10,000 horsemen to raid across the Liao River frontier. Another unsuccessful expedition to Goguryeo was sent in 648.

=== 3rd Goguryeo (658) ===
Emperor Gaozong of Tang sent an unsuccessful expedition to Goguryeo in 658 before agreeing to conduct a joint invasion of Baekje with Silla.

=== Baekje (660–663) ===
In the fall of 660, Su Dingfang led a naval invasion of Baekje. The Tang army defeated the army of Baekje at the mouth of the Geum River. They then sailed up the river and captured Baekje's capital, Sabi, conquering the kingdom. The natives rebelled soon after and besieged Liu Renyuan in the capital until Liu Rengui could bring in reinforcements. A stalemate ensued with Baekje holding some cities while Silla and the Tang occupied others. Baekje called the Yamato for help. In the autumn of 663, a combined Tang-Silla army marched for Churyu, the capital of the rebels. Meanwhile, the Tang fleet encountered and destroyed the Yamato fleet at the Battle of Baekgang at the mouth of the Geum River. Churyu was captured on 14 October and the rebellion was vanquished.

=== 4th Goguryeo (661–662) ===
In the summer of 661, Su Dingfang led an army of 44,000 across the sea and laid siege to Pyeongyang while another Tang army under Qibi Heli advanced overland. Qibi Heli defeated a Goguryeo army at the Yalu River but Su Dingfang failed to take Pyeongyang. The invasion was called off in the spring of 662 when a subsidiary Tang force led by ex-rebel Nanman general Pang Xiaotai was defeated.

=== 5th Goguryeo (667–668) ===
In early 667, a Tang invasion of Goguryeo was launched with Li Shiji at its head. The Tang army easily swept away the border fortifications and pressed into Goguryeo's heartland in the spring of 668. Pyeongyang fell on 22 October and the Tang annexed Goguryeo.

=== Silla (672–676) ===
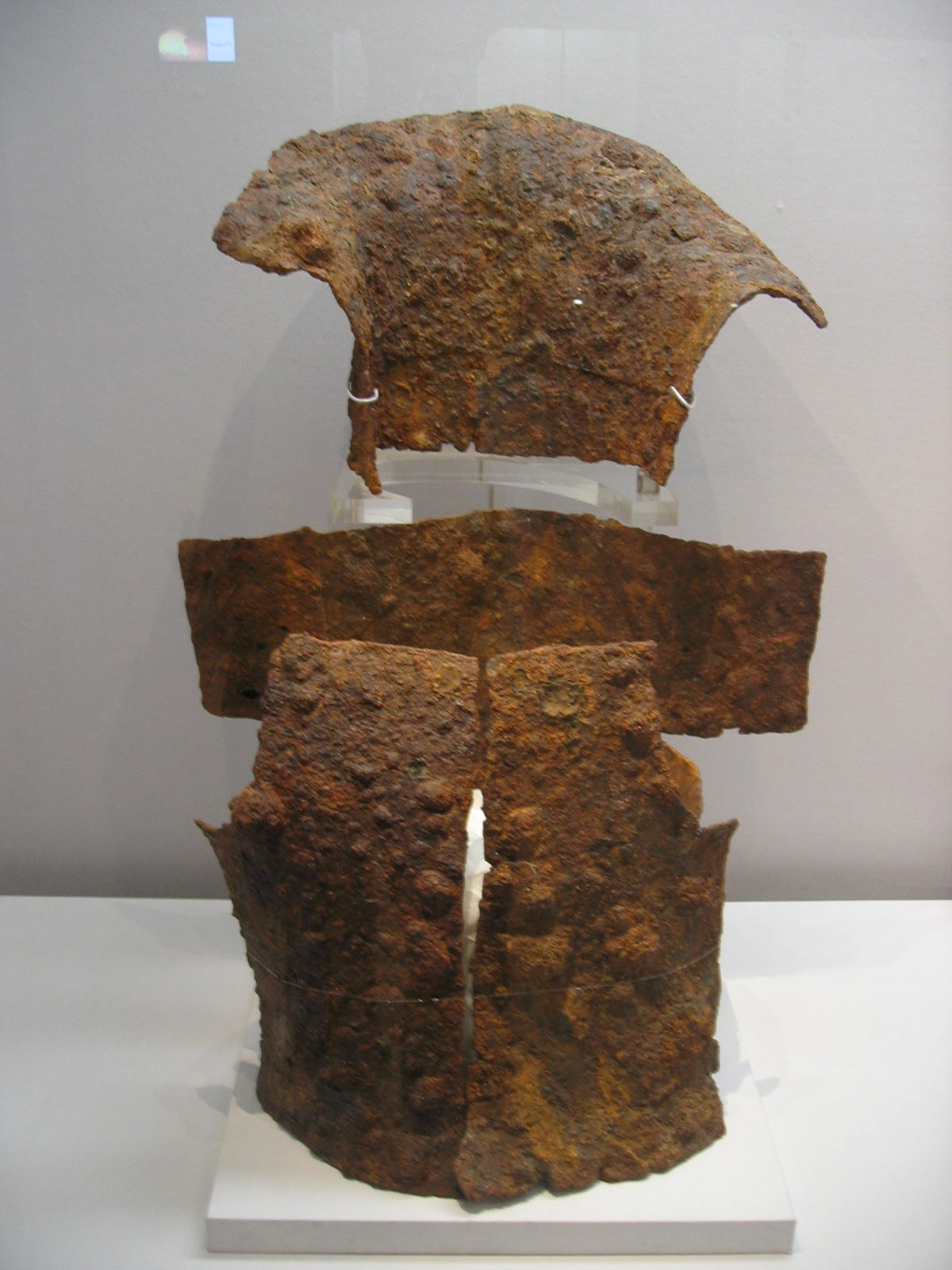
Iron plate armour from Silla, 4th century AD

In 672, Silla attacked Tang positions in Korea. By 674, they had taken all the territory of what was previously Baekje. In 675, Liu Rengui attacked Silla and defeated them in Gyeonggi. In response Munmu of Silla dispatched a tributary mission to Tang with apologies. Emperor Gaozong of Tang accepted Munmu's apologies and withdrew Tang troops to deal with the Tibetan threat in the west. Seeing the Tang's strategic weakness, Silla renewed the advance on Tang territory, taking all the territory south of the Daedong River by 676.

=== Balhae (698) ===
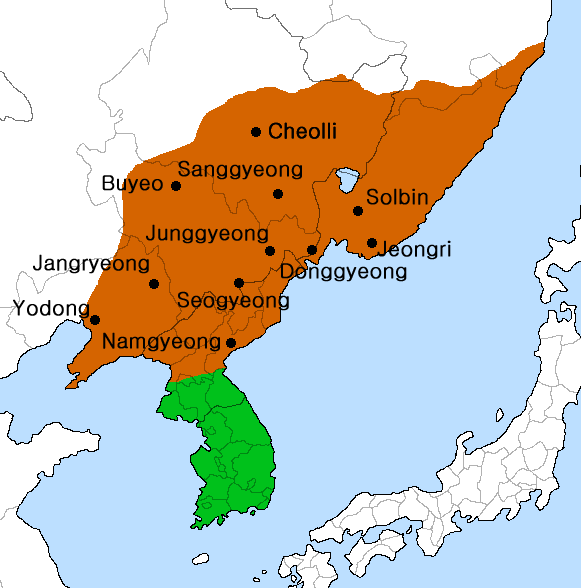
Balhae in 830

In 698, Dae Jo-yeong's Goguryeo remnants and Mohe people defeated Tang forces at the Battle of Tianmenling. He then established the state of Jin (震) in Manchuria, later renamed Balhae (渤海) in 712.

=== Lesser Goguryeo (699) ===
In 699, Ko Tŏngmu rebelled and created Lesser Goguryeo; the Protectorate General to Pacify the East was moved to Pingzhou, in modern Lulong County.

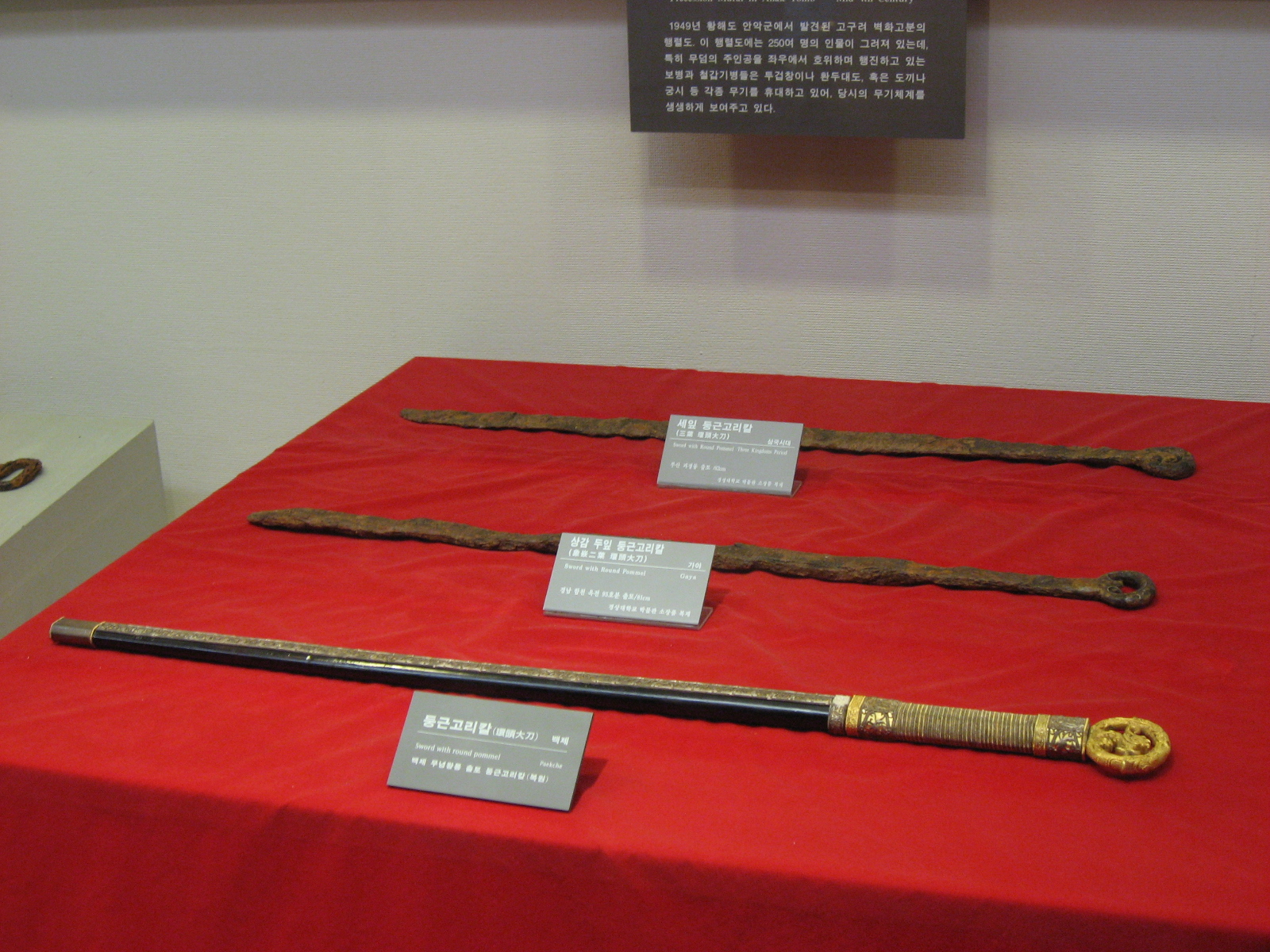
Swords from the Three Kingdoms of Korea

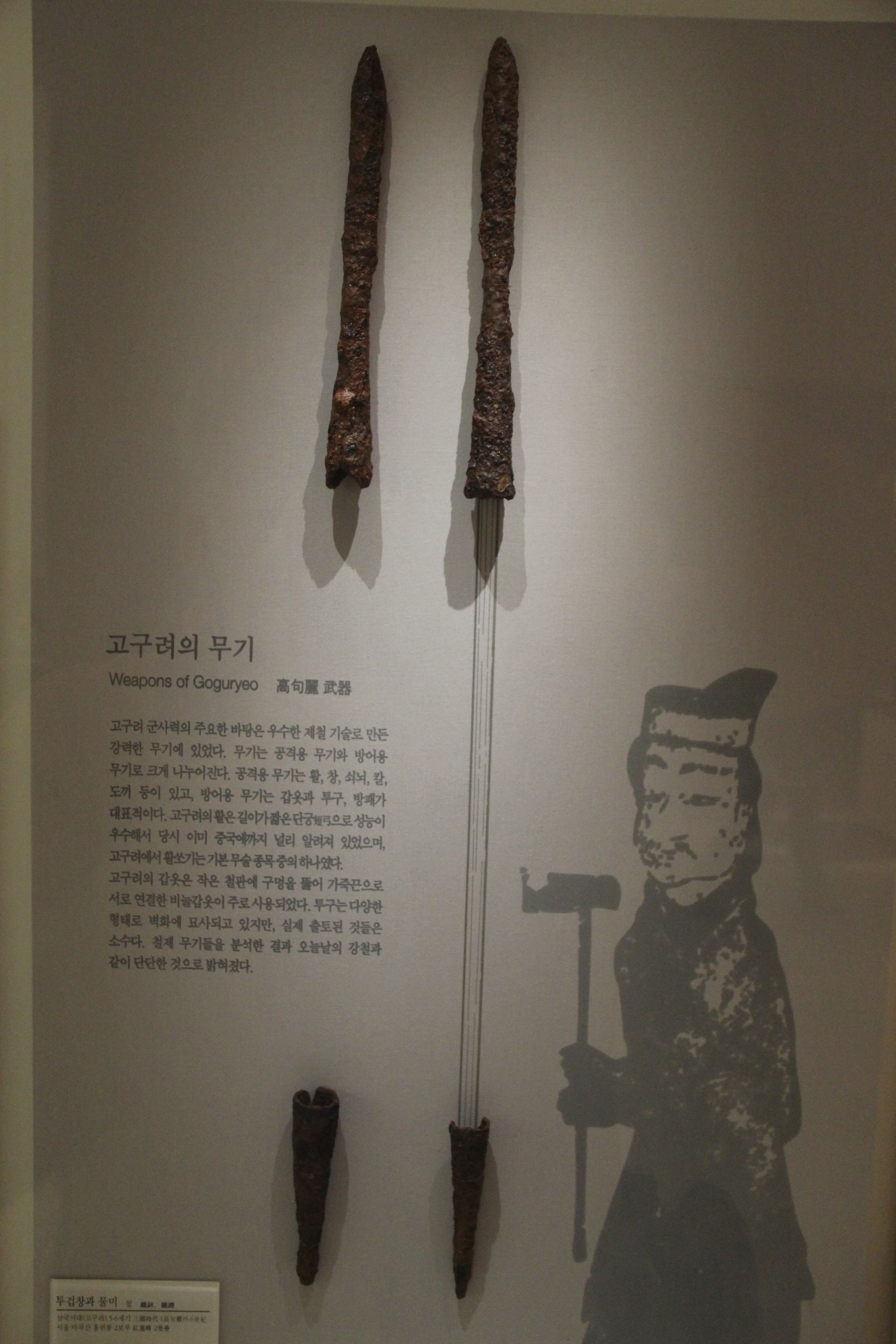
Spearheads from Goguryeo

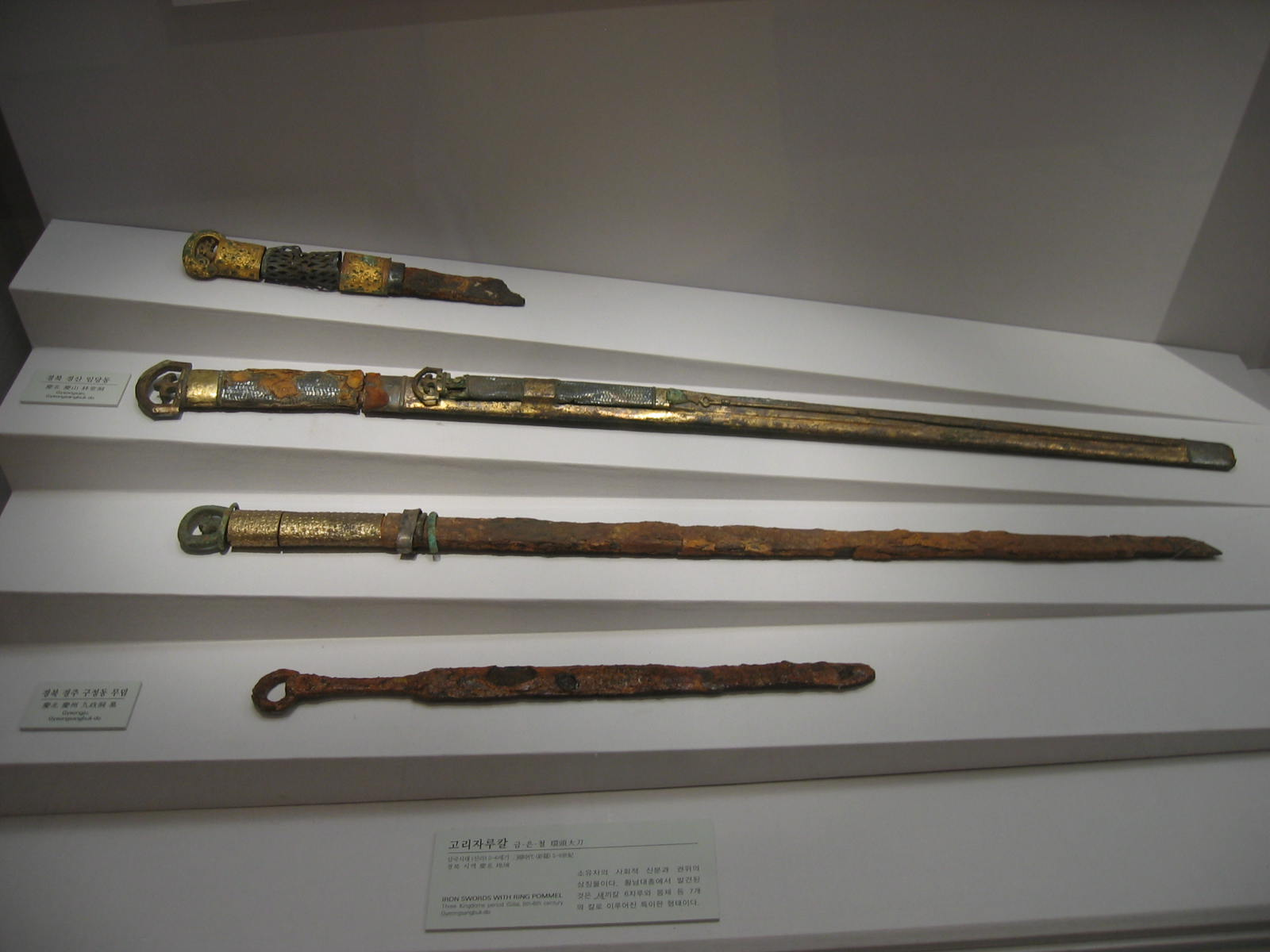
Iron swords from Silla

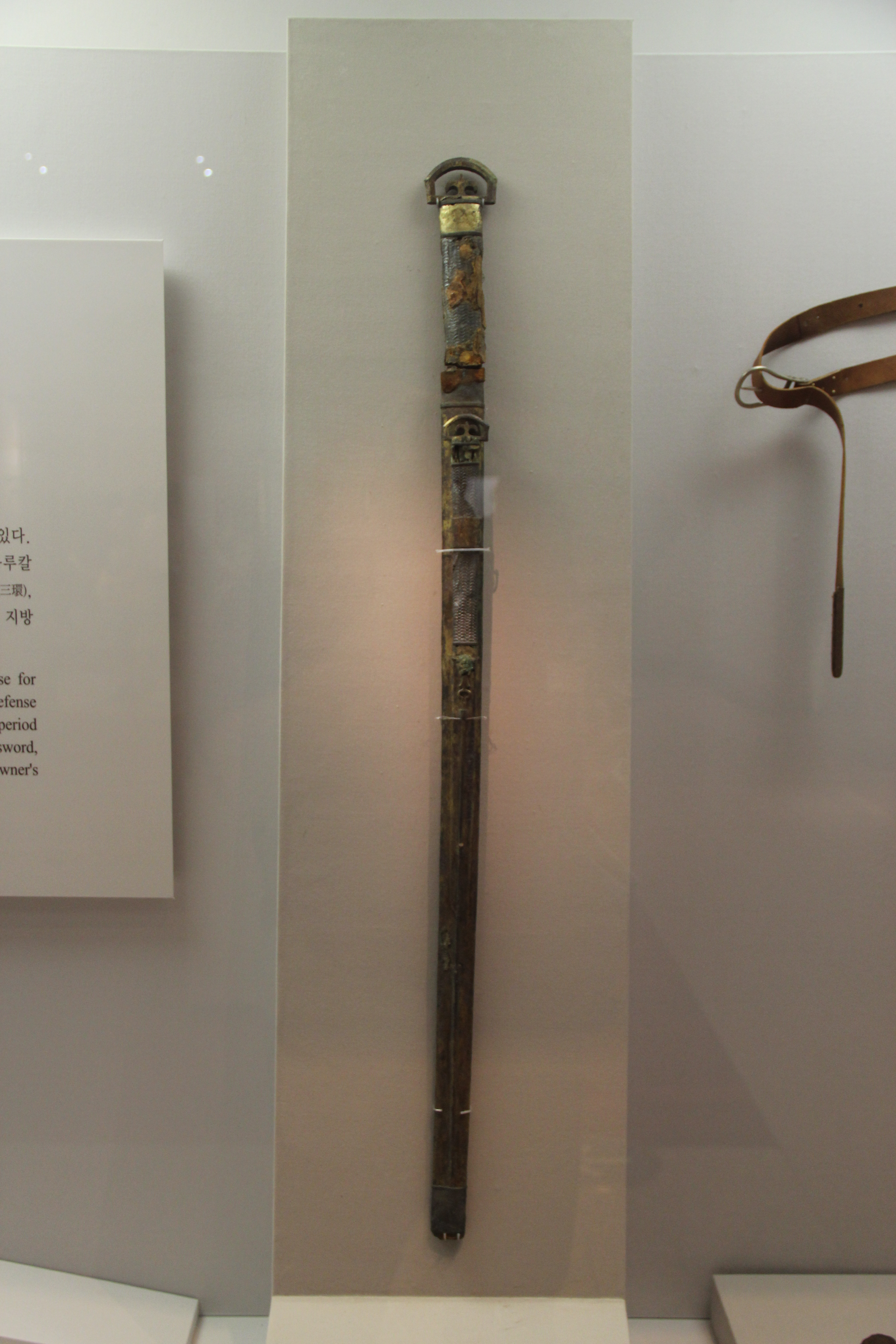
Iron sword, Silla

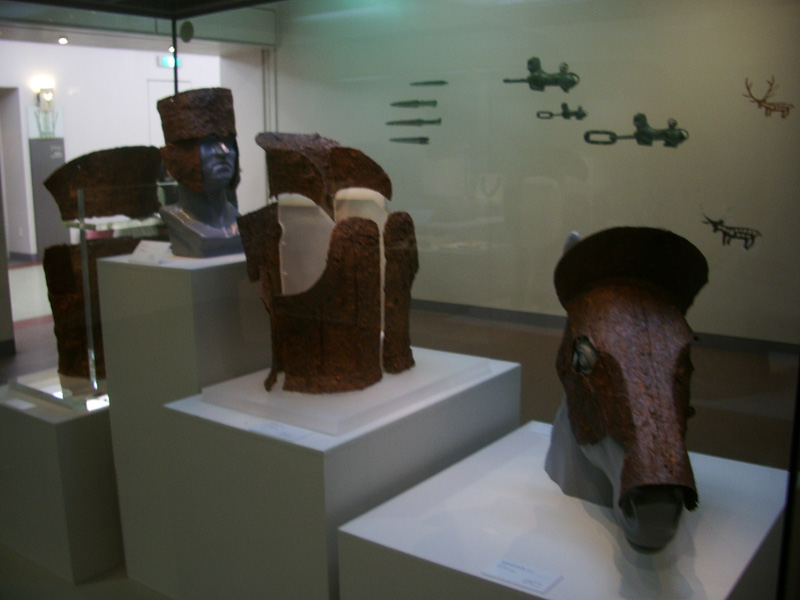
Cavalry armour, Silla

== Tibet ==
=== 1st Tuyuhun (623) ===
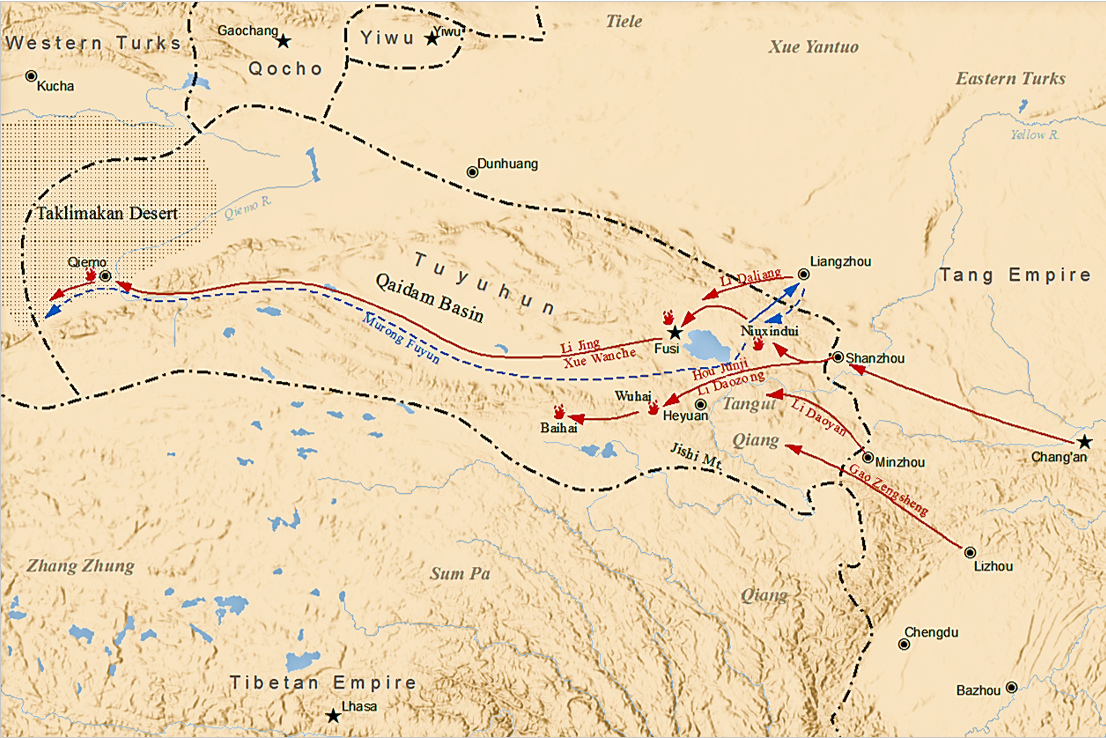
Tang-Tuyuhun War, 634–635

In 623, the Tuyuhun, a people of mixed Xianbei and Qiang stock residing in modern Qinghai Province, invaded the northwest but were defeated by Chai Shao.

=== 2nd Tuyuhun (634–635) ===
In 634, Li Jing and Hou Junji embarked on a campaign against the Tuyuhun. They traveled for five months before catching up with the Tuyuhun northeast of Qinghai Lake and defeated them in 635. Murong Shun surrendered to the Tang but failed to keep power in his territory and was killed. Tuyuhun was thereafter ruled by Murong Nuohebo until it was conquered by the Tibetan Empire in 663.

=== 1st Tibetan Empire (639) ===
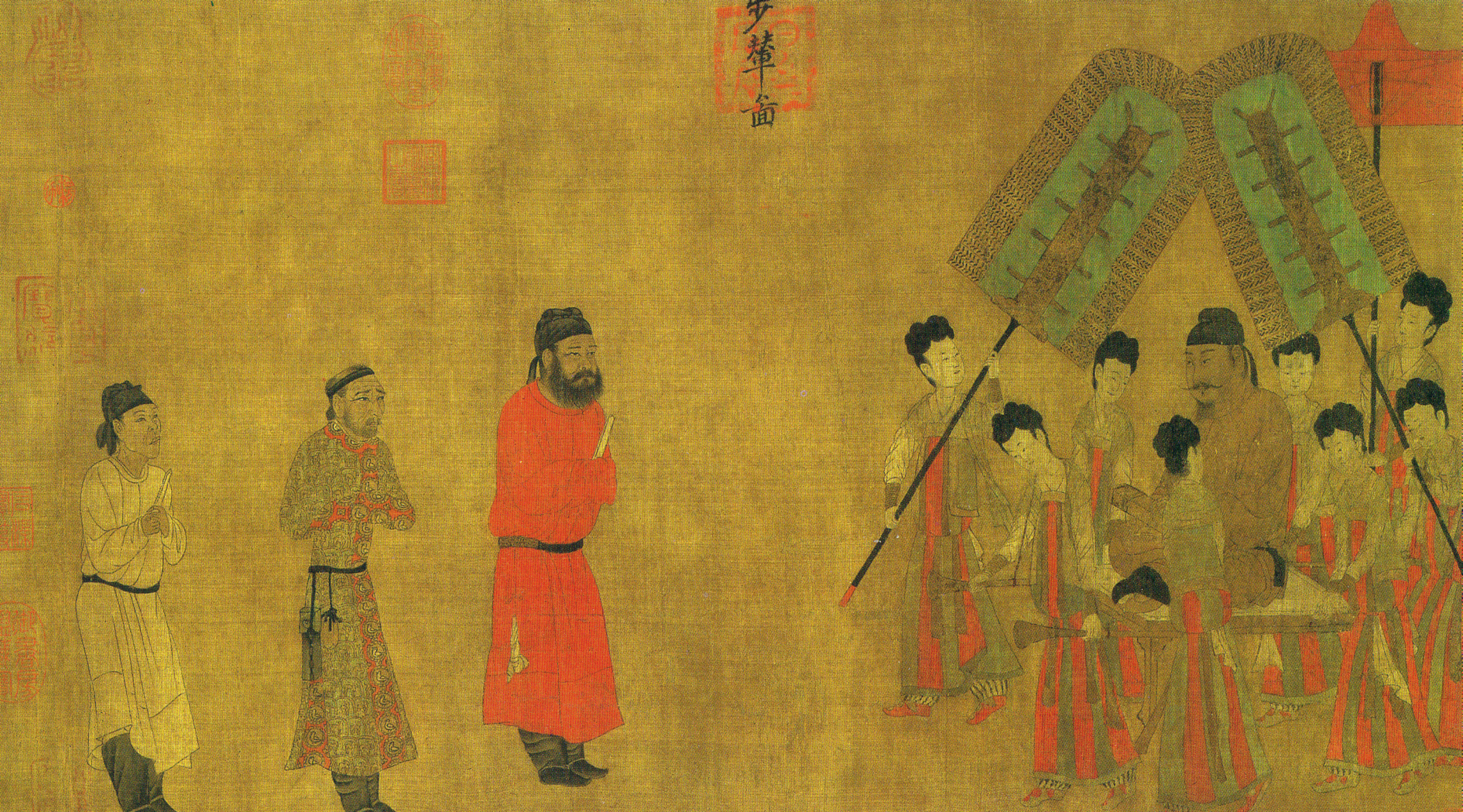
The Imperial Sedan Chair: Emperor Taizong depicted giving an audience to Gar Tongtsen Yulsung, the ambassador of the Tibetan Empire, in a painting by court artist Yan Liben (600-673 AD)

In 639, Songtsen Gampo of the Tibetan Empire personally led an army against Songzhou (Songpan). The neighboring prefectures of Kuazhou and Nuozhou defected to the Tibetan side. Songzhou's governor attacked the Tibetans but lost. The Tang court dispatched 50,000 soldiers under Hou Junji to relieve Songzhou. Hou attacked Songtsen Gampo's camp at night, killing some 1,000 Tibetan soldiers. Songtsen Gampo called off the campaign and sent an envoy to Songzhou to apologize. However he insisted to a marriage alliance, to which Emperor Taizong of Tang agreed to in 640.

=== 2nd Tibetan Empire (659–665) ===
In 659, the Tibetan Empire sent 80,000 soldiers to attack Heyuan River in modern Qinghai Province. They were defeated by only 1,000 troops under Su Dingfang. The Tibetans returned the next year and attacked Shule, then Khotan in 663 and 665. They were repelled.

=== 3rd Tibetan Empire (667–674) ===
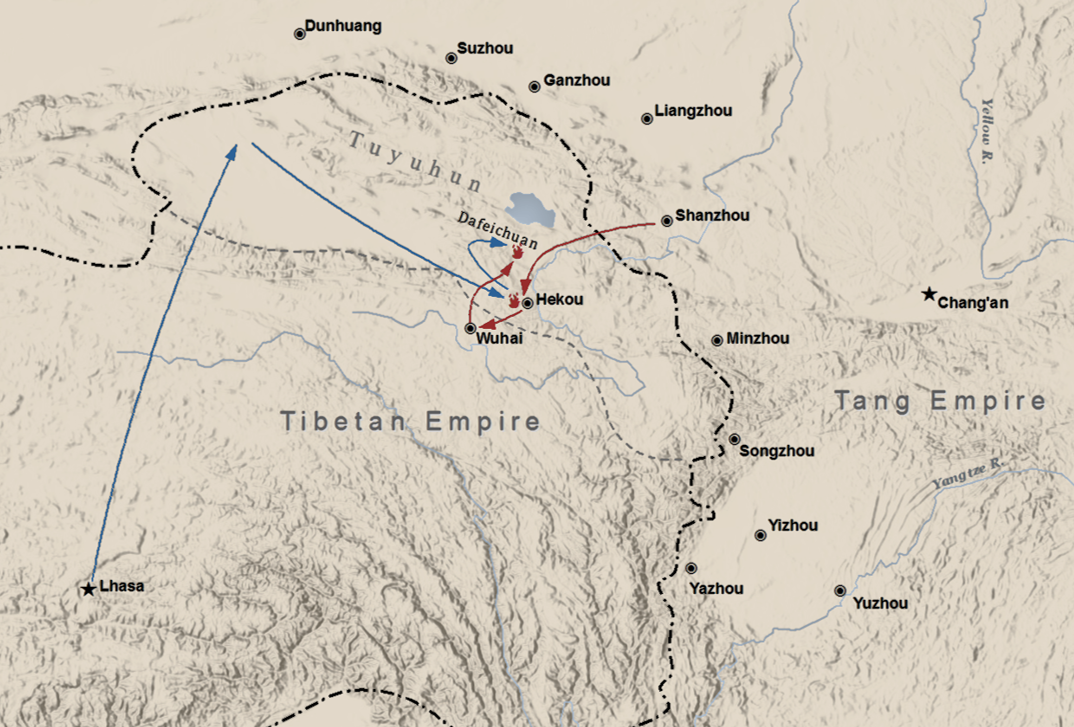
Battle of Dafei River, 667–674

In 667, the Tibetan Empire launched an attack on the Anxi Protectorate, taking 18 prefectures. In the spring of 670, Emperor Gaozong of Tang dispatched two expeditionary forces, one to Qinghai, the other to the Western Regions. The Qinghai expedition under Xue Rengui split into two columns. The column under Guo Daifeng was intercepted by a Tibetan force of 20,000 and back to abandon their supplies in order to flee to Dafei River on a plain southwest of Qinghai Lake. Xue Rengui hurried back to join Guo Daifeng but they were defeated anyway. The Tibetans annexed the former territory of the Tuyuhun, conquered Qiuci, sacked Shule and attacked Gumo.

The Tang force to the Western Regions retook Shule in the middle of 673 and reverted the Kingdom of Khotan (Yutian) and Kucha (Qiuci) to Tang suzerainty. According to Christopher I. Beckwith, between 670-692, the Tang did not recapture the Western Regions and controlled only Suiye (after 692) and Xizhou. Beckwith argues that the king of Khotan that submitted to the Tang in 675 was actually a refugee fleeing from the Tibetans and there is no evidence of Tang military action in this region at this time. The king died at the Tang court and his son was still there in 691. However, Kucha remained outside of Tibetan control and the Tibetans attacked Kucha in 687.

=== 4th Tibetan Empire (676–681) ===
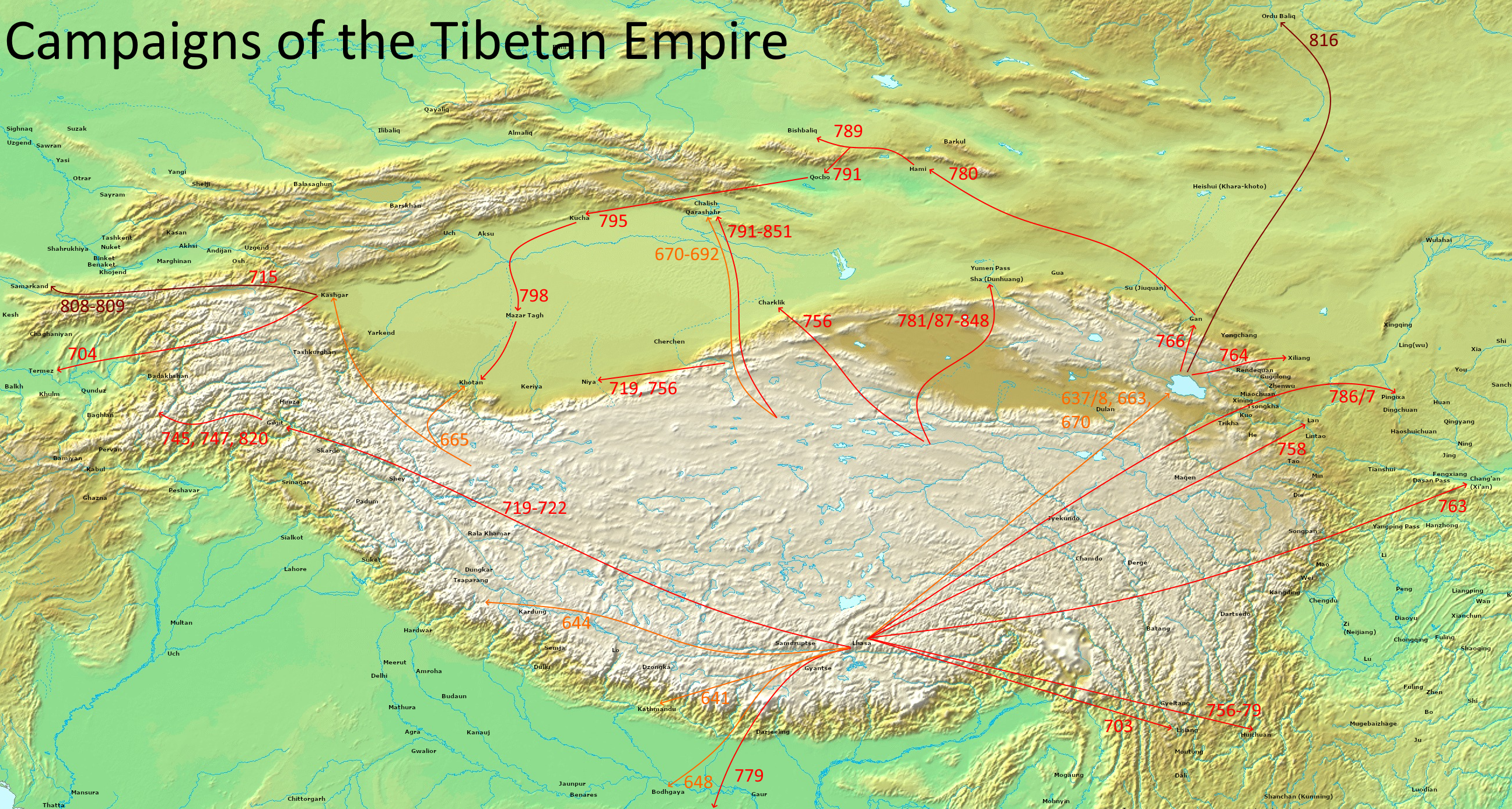
Campaigns of the Tibetan Empire, 7-9th centuries

In 676, the Tibetan Empire attacked Diezhou, Fuzhou, and Jingzhou. Fengtian and Wugong were sacked. In 677, the Tibetans captured Qiuci. In 678, they defeated a Tang army in the Qinghai region. Their advances were reversed in 679 when Pei Xingjian defeated them and re-established control over the Western Regions. In 680, the Tibetans captured the Anrong fortress (northwest of Mao County) in Sichuan. The Tibetans used this chance to build bridges across the Bi River and erect guard towers around them. The Tang counterattacked and destroyed the bridges. A Tibetan invasion of Qinghai was defeated in 681.

=== 5th Tibetan Empire (690–696) ===
After the Tang dynasty abandoned the Western Regions in 686 due to excessive military expenditures, the Tibetan Empire took control of the region. Wu Zetian later on decided to retake the region and sent two expeditions against the Tibetans. The first one in 690 was defeated at Issyk-Kul while the second one succeeded in 692. The Tibetans returned in 694 and attacked the Stone City (Charklik). In the spring of 696, the Tibetan Empire dealt a great defeat to a Tang army at Suluohan Mountain in Taozhou and attacked Liangzhou. However they were unable to follow up the victory due to court politics involving Tridu Songtsen and Gar Trinring Tsendro.

=== 6th Tibetan Empire (700–702) ===
The Four Horns of the Tibetan Empire

In 700, Tridu Songtsen of the Tibetan Empire attacked Hezhou and Liangzhou. In 701, he allied with Türks and attacked Liangzhou, Songzhou, and Taozhou. In 702, the Tibetan Empire attacked Maozhou.

=== 7th Tibetan Empire (710) ===
In 710, Zhang Xuanbiao of the Protectorate General to Pacify the West and Li Zhigu invaded northeastern Tibet. Li subjugated some tribes and started constructing a fortress at Dengtan (Dengchuan). All the local chieftains were killed and their children enslaved. The locals rebelled, dismembered Li's body, and used the remains as a sacrifice to Heaven.

=== 8th Tibetan Empire (714–717) ===
In 714, the Tibetan Empire attacked Lintao, Weiyuan, Lanzhou and Weizhou, but ultimately suffered a major defeat. In 715, the Tibetans attacked the Beiting Protectorate and Songzhou. In 717, they allied with the Arabs and Turgesh to attack Gumo and the Stone City, but were defeated at the Battle of Aksu (717). A Tibetan army was also defeated by Guo Zhiyun at the "Bends of the Yellow River".

=== 9th Tibetan Empire (720–724) ===
In 720, the Tibetan Empire seized the Stone City.

In 722, Tang assisted Little Balur (小勃律, a city state centering modern Gilgit, Pakistan, in Kashmir) in repulsing advancing Tibetan troops.

In 724, Wang Junchuo launched an attack on the Tibetan Empire and scores a victory.

=== 10th Tibetan Empire (726–729) ===
In 726, Stag sgra khon lod of the Tibetan Empire attacked Ganzhou but most of their forces die in a snowstorm and the rest were mopped up by Wang Junchuo.

In 727, Stag sgra khon lod and Cog ro Manporje along with the Turgesh attacked Qiuci and Guazhou. In 728, they attacked Qiuci again.

In 729, Zhang Shougui (張守珪) inflicted a major defeat on the Tibetan Empire at Xining.

=== 11th Tibetan Empire (738–745) ===
In 738, the Tang captured Anrong, but immediately lost it to the Tibetans.

In 739, the Tang defeated a Tibetan army at Shan Prefecture.

In 740, the Tang captured Anrong again.

In 741, the Tibetans invaded the Qinghai region but were repelled. They sacked the Stone City on their way home.

In 742, Huangfu Weiming of Longyou and Wang Chui of Hexi invaded northeastern Tibet and killed several thousand Tibetans.

In 743, the Tang recovered the Jiuqu (九曲) area from the Tibetan Empire.

In 745, the Tibetans defeated a Tang army at the Stone City.

=== 12th Tibetan Empire (749) ===
In 749, Longyou defense command under Geshu Han retook the Stone City but suffered heavy casualties.

=== 13th Tibetan Empire (753) ===
In 753, Geshu Han drove the Tibetans from the Jiuqu region on the upper course of the Yellow River.

=== 14th Tibetan Empire (757) ===
In 757, the Tibetan Empire conquered Shanzhou (Haidong).

=== 15th Tibetan Empire (763–766) ===
In November 763, a Tibetan army 100,000 strong advanced against the Tang capital of Chang'an. The Tibetans defeated a Tang force at Zhouzhi on 12 November. The next day, Emperor Daizong of Tang fled to Shanzhou. Chang'an was captured by the Tibetans on 18 November. They were however, unable to keep their position, as Guo Ziyi rallied Tang troops in Shangzhou and advanced the on city from the southeast, while other Tang commander advanced from the north. The Tibetan army abandoned Chang'an on 30 November, taking with them large amounts of captives and plunder. Meanwhile, the Tibetans also invaded the Protectorate General to Pacify the West and conquered Yanqi.

In 764, the Tibetan Empire invaded again with a 70,000 strong army and conquered Liangzhou, but was ultimately repulsed by Yan Wu in Jiannan.

In 765, the Tibetan Empire invaded with 30,000 troops and Uyghur allies, advancing as far as Fengtian twice but was repulsed by Guo Ziyi, who convinced the Uyghurs to switch sides.

In 766, the Tibetans conquered Ganzhou and Suzhou.

=== 16th Tibetan Empire (776) ===
In 776, the Tibetan Empire conquered Guazhou.

=== 17th Tibetan Empire (781) ===
In 781, the Tibetan Empire conquered Yizhou.

=== 18th Tibetan Empire (786–793) ===
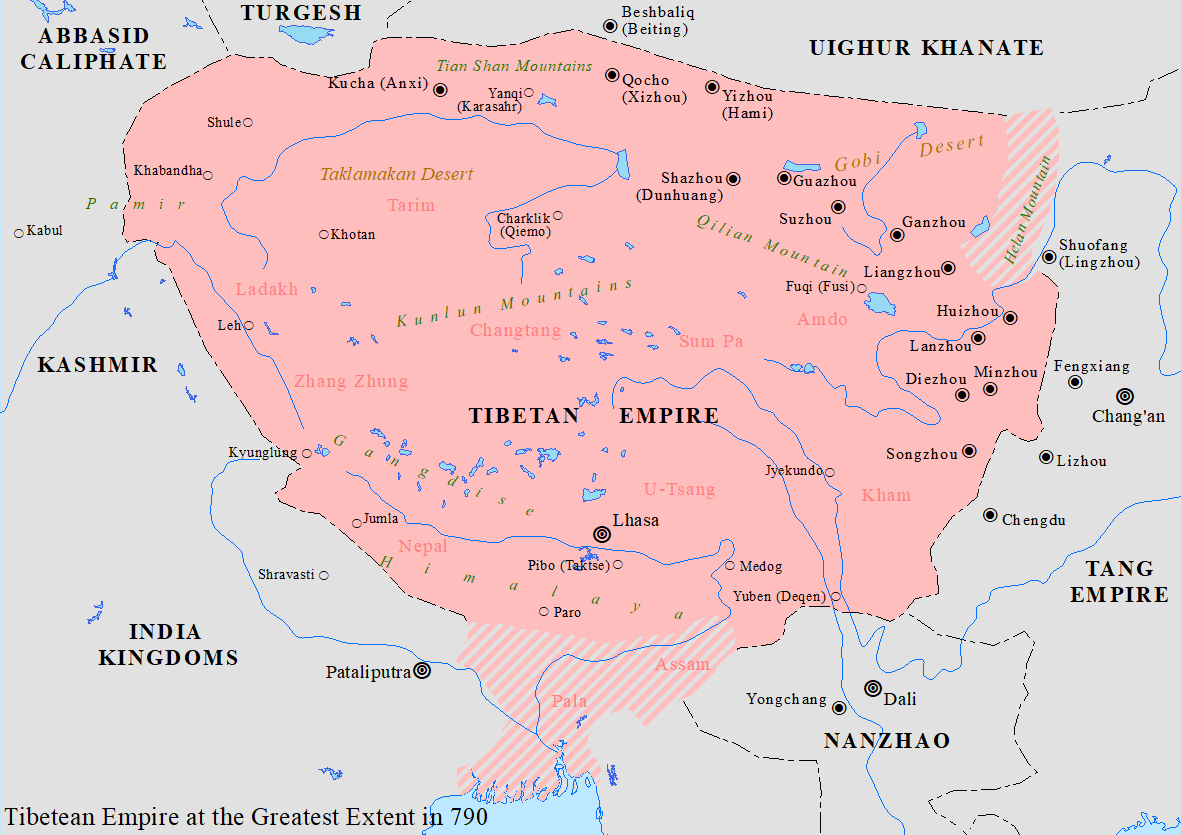
Tibetan Empire in 790

In 786, the Tibetan Empire conquered Yanzhou and Xiazhou. The Tang tried to make peace at the Treaty of Pingliang the next year, but the Tibetans double crossed them, and took their officials and officers as captives. After that they destroyed Yanzhou and Xiazhou before retreating. In 787, the Tibetans captured Shazhou and Qiuci. In 788, the Tang defeated a Tibetan army at Xizhou. In 789, the Tibetans attacked Longzhou, Jingzhou, and Bingzhou. In 790, the Tibetans conquered Tingzhou. In 792, the Tibetans conquered Xizhou and Yutian. The Tang general Wei Gao stopped the Tibetan advance by defeating a 30,000 Tibetan strong army, recovering Yanzhou.

=== 19th Tibetan Empire (796) ===
In 796, the Tibetans attacked Qingzhou but the campaign ended abruptly when chief minister Nanam Shang Gyaltsen Lhanang died.

=== 20th Tibetan decline and Tang counterattack (801-866) ===
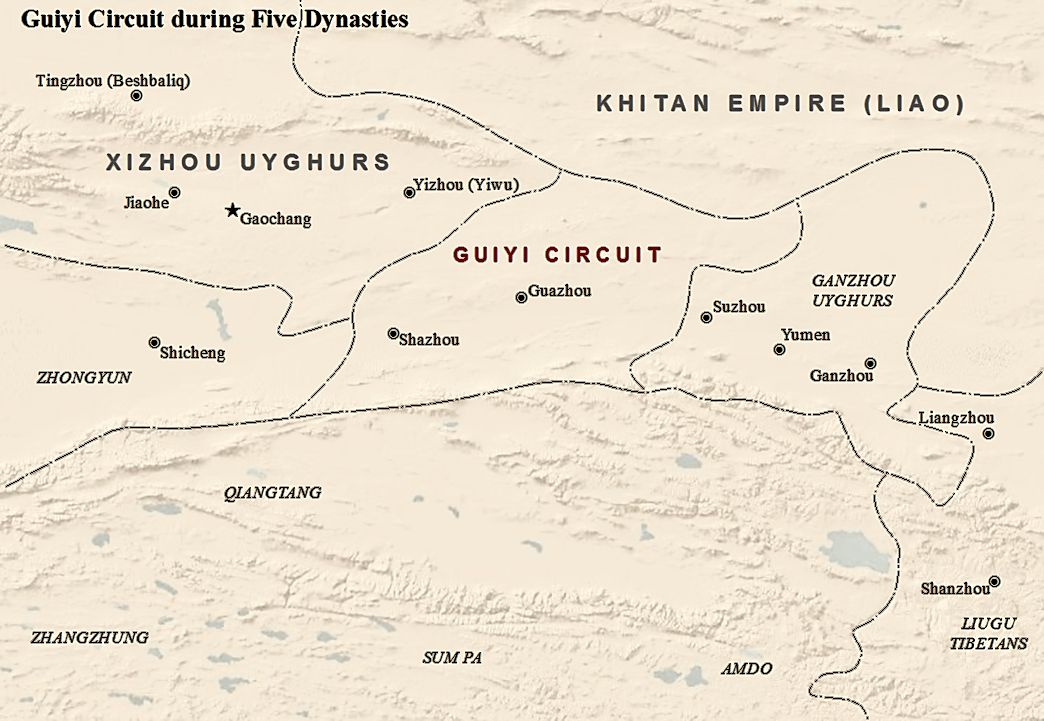
Guiyi Circuit

In 801, the Tang and Nanzhao dealt a defeat to the Tibetans and Abbasid slave soldiers.

The Samarkandi and Abbasid Arab troops, and the Tibetan commanders, all surrendered. Twenty thousand suits of armor were captured.

— New Book of Tang

In 803, the Tang pushed the Tibetan Empire back to Pingliang.

In 819, the Tibetan Empire attacked Qingzhou.

In 821, a Tibetan invasion was driven off by the governor of Yanzhou.

In 847, a Tang army defeated the Tibetans at Yanzhou.

In 848, Zhang Yichao, a resident of Shazhou, rebelled against the Tibetan Empire and captured Shazhou and Guazhou. Zhang went on to capture Ganzhou, Suzhou, and Yizhou in 850, and then submitted a petition to Emperor Xuānzong of Tang, offering his loyalty and submission. In 851, Zhang captured Xizhou and the Tang emperor made him Guiyi Jiedushi (歸義節度使, Governor of the Guiyi Circuit) and Cao Yijin his secretary general.

In 849, Tibetan commanders and soldiers in eastern Gansu defected to the Tang.

In 861, Zhang Yichao retook Liangzhou, extending the Guiyi Circuit's authority to Xizhou, Guazhou, Ganzhou, Suzhou, Yzhou, Lanzhou, Shanzhou, Hezhou, Minzhou, Liangzhou, and Kuozhou.

In 866, Zhang Yichao defeated bLon Khrom brZhe (Baönhom Barzé) and seized Tingzhou and Luntai but immediately lost them as well as Xizhou to the Kingdom of Qocho. Baönhom Barzé was an attack commissioner in the region. After Langdarma's death in 842, he fought constantly with another commissioner, Shang Bibi. He was captured by Shang Bibi's subordinate, Tuoba Huaiguang, in 866 and sent to the Tang court.

== Western Regions ==
Emperor Taizong's campaign against the Western Regions

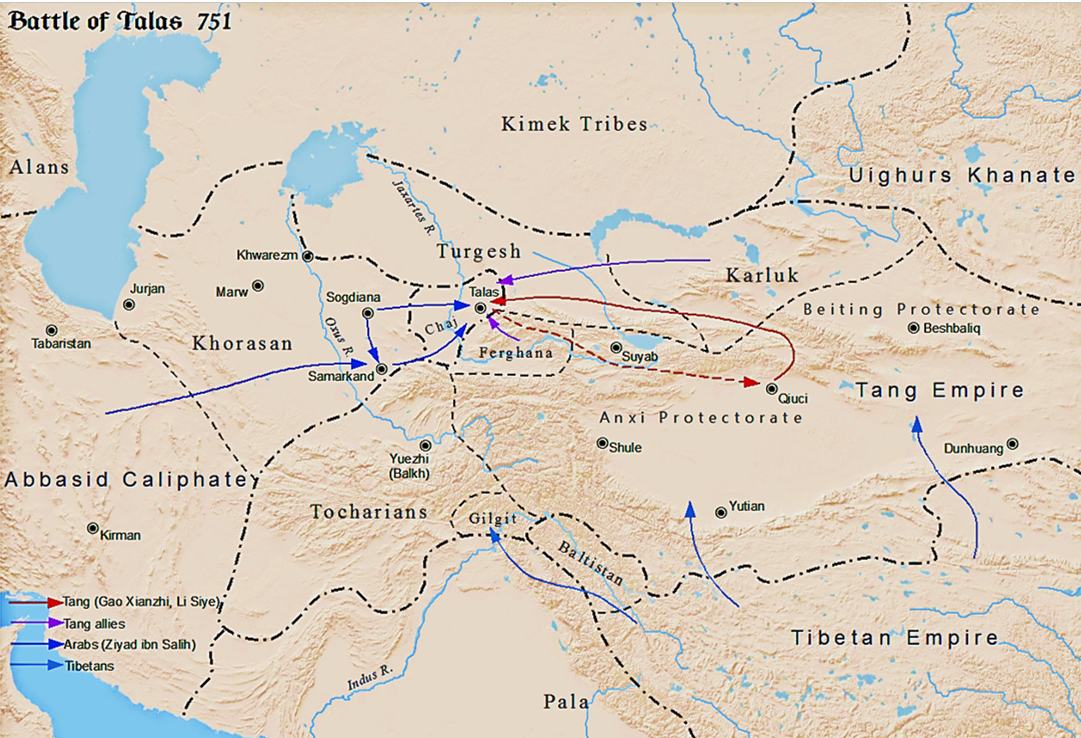
Battle of Talas, 751

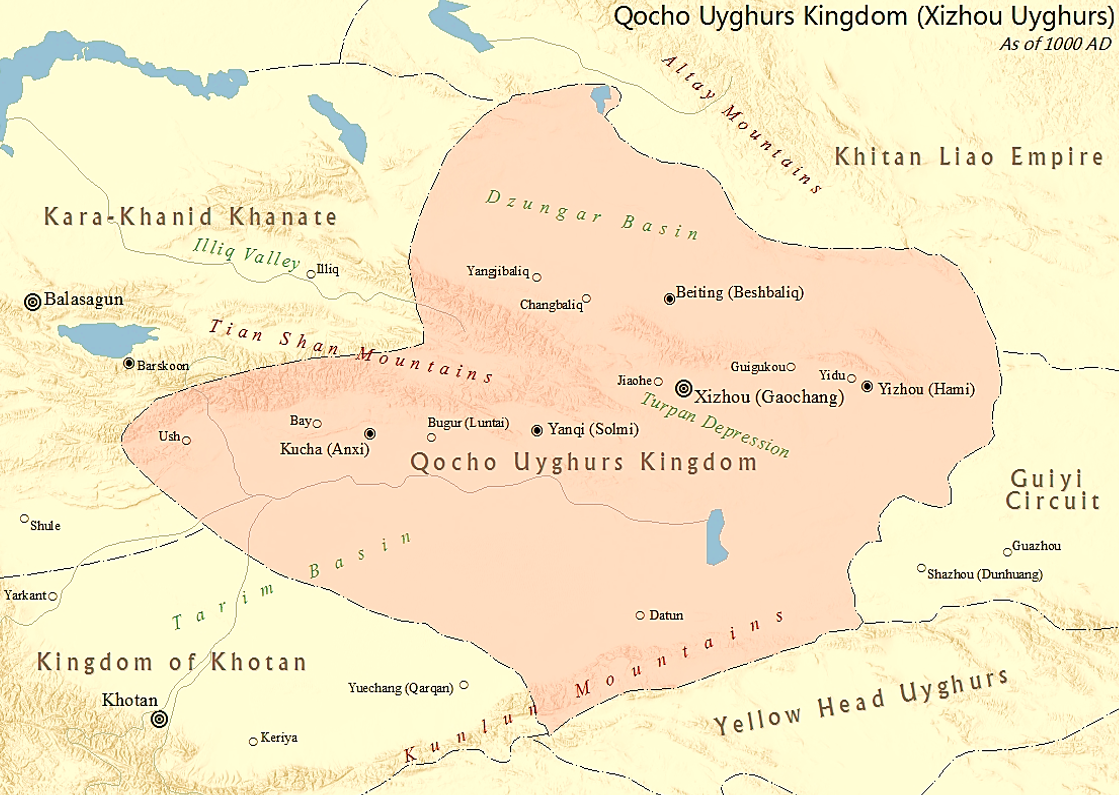
Qocho

=== Gaochang (638–640) ===
In late 638, a Tang army under Hou Junji was sent against Gaochang. It arrived a year later and Karakhoja's king died of fright. His son surrendered. Gaochang was annexed on 19 September 640 and became Xizhou.

=== 1st Yanqi (644) ===
In 644, Guo Xiaoke was sent against Yanqi, which had allied itself to the Western Turkic Khaganate. When the Tang army arrived, it defeated a Western Turk army and tributized Yanqi.

=== 2nd Yanqi (648) ===
In 648, the Yanqi king was overthrown by a cousin, so another Tang army under Ashina She'er was sent in to place another member on the royal throne. The new king declared himself a Tang vassal.

=== Kucha (648–649) ===
In 648, Ashina She'er conquered Kucha and put under the control of Guo Xiaoke. Remnants of Kuchean forces retook the city soon after and killed Guo, but Ashina She'er returned and defeated them as well as taking five other cities. An additional 11,000 inhabitants were killed as reprisal for the death of Guo Xiaoke.

Since the Kingdom of Khotan and the Shule Kingdom had already previously submitted to Tang authority in 632, with Shache following as well in 635, and Gumo (Aksu) in 644, the Tang dynasty now had complete control over the Western Regions.

=== Khotan (725) ===
In 725, the king of Khotan rebelled but was immediately replaced with a Tang puppet by the Anxi Protectorate.

=== Little Balur (745) ===
In 745, Gao Xianzhi marched across the Pamirs with 10,000 men and conquered Little Balur (Gilgit), a client state of the Tibetan Empire.

=== Chach (750) ===
In 750 the Tang intervened in a dispute between their vassal Fergana and the neighboring kingdom of Chach, located in modern Tashkent. The kingdom of Chach was sacked and their king was taken back to Chang'an, where he was executed. In the same year Tang also defeated Qieshi in Chitral and the Turgesh.

=== Talas (751) ===
In 751, Tang forces under Gao Xianzhi suffered a major defeat at the Battle of Talas against the Abbasid when their Karluk allies defected to the enemies.

=== Qocho (869–870) ===
In 869 and 870, the Kingdom of Qocho attacked the Guiyi Circuit but was defeated.

=== Qocho (876) ===
In 876, Qocho conquered Yizhou.

== Khitans ==
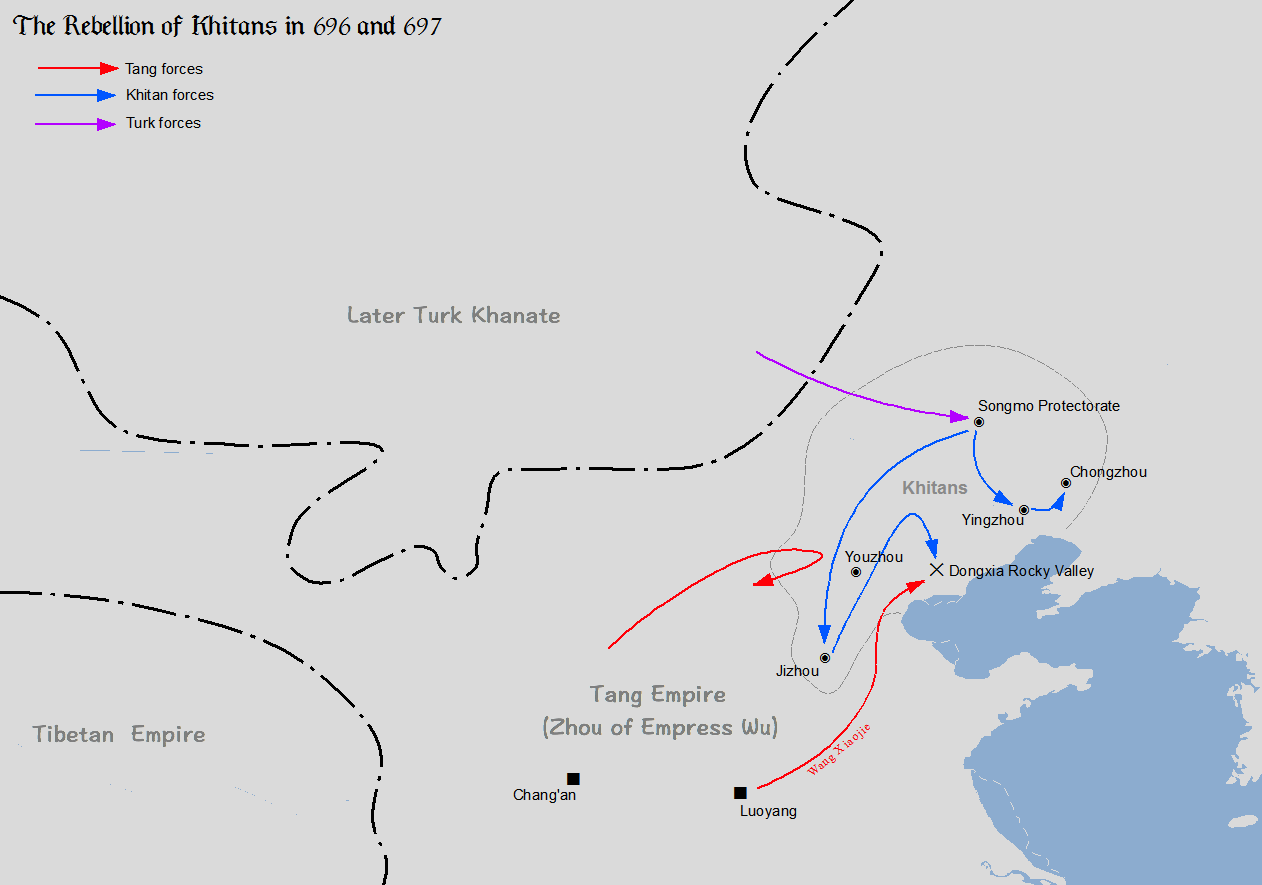
The Khitan rebellion led by Li Jinzhong, 696

In 696, Li Jinzhong (Mushang Khan) of the Khitans along with his brother-in-law Sun Wanrong rebelled against Tang hegemony and attacked Hebei. Li died soon after and Sun succeeded him, only to be defeated by the Second Turkic Khaganate.

In 720, the governor-general of Yingzhou sent 500 Tang soldiers to back Suogu against Ketuyu in Khitan politics but was defeated.

In 730, Ketuyu attacked the Tang but was heavily defeated in a counterattack in 732. Although he allied himself with the Türks, they were defeated again in 733 by a Tang and Kumo Xi army. Zhang Shougui defeated the Khitans again in 734 and Ketuyu was finally murdered by Guozhe in 735, who became the next leader of the Khitans.

In 736, An Lushan attacked the Khitans but was defeated.

In 745, two Khitan tribes revolted and were defeated by An Lushan.

In 752, An Lushan attacked the Khitans.

== Nanzhao ==
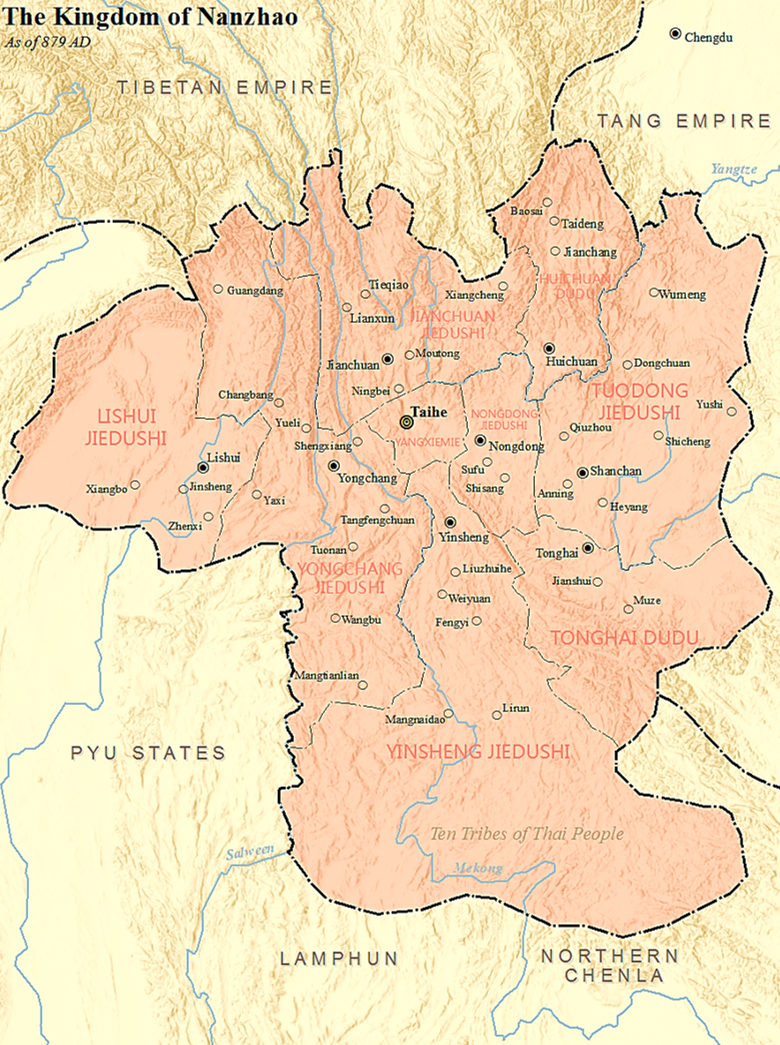
Nanzhao (738–937)

=== 1st Cuanman (649-656) ===
In 618, the Tang dynasty assigned Duan Lun as Commander-in-Chief (zongguan) to Yizhou (Chengdu). Cuan Hongda of the Cuanman was assigned to Kunzhou (Kunming) as prefect. Duan sent his subordinate, Yu Dashi, into Hongda's territory to persuade local tribes to give their allegiance to the Tang. Western Cuan was the first to pledge allegiance. In 621, a Tang official, Ji Hongwei, arrived in Nanning (Qujing) and won over more tribes. Some 30 jimi prefectures were created. However exorbitant taxation of the local population caused them to rebel. Duan sentenced them all to death. He was removed from power and transferred back to the capital. After Hongda died, the local chieftains requested the prefectures return to hereditary rule.

In 624, Wei Renshou was assigned to administrate Xizhou (Xichang). He led a small group of 500 soldiers into Xierhe (Erhai) and received the submission of many local tribes. Wei was allegedly fair and transparent in his governance so that when he departed for Xizhou, the locals begged him to stay. The chieftains gathered men and built an office for him in Nanning. After an audience with the emperor along with the chieftains' sons bearing tribute, Wei Renshou was transferred to Nanning.

In 648, Liu Boying, the Commander-in-Chief of Xizhou, suggested sending an expedition to open a way through Xierhe to India. A large army was mobilized under the command of Liang Jianfang, who entered modern day Yanbian in southwestern Sichuan and killed several thousand tribesmen. The brutality scared the local populace so much that over 90,000 households all the way to Xierhe surrendered. From 649 to 656, Tang forces campaigned in northern Yunnan. In 664, Yaozhou Area Command was created over 24 prectures in northern and northwestern Yunnan.

=== 1st Nanzhao (751) ===
In 751, Xianyu Zhongtong attacked Nanzhao with an army of 80,000 but was utterly defeated, losing three quarters of his original force.

=== 2nd Nanzhao (754) ===
In 754, Yang Guozhong invaded Nanzhao but failed to engage with the enemy until supplies ran out, at which time they were attacked and routed.

=== 3rd Nanzhao (829) ===
In 829, Nanzhao sacked Chengdu.

=== 4th Nanzhao (846) ===
In 846, Nanzhao raided Annan.

=== 5th Nanzhao (860-861) ===
In 860, Nanzhao attacked Bozhou and Annan, briefly taking Songping before being driven out by a Tang army the next year. Prior to the governor Li Hu's arrival, Nanzhao had already seized Bozhou. When Li Hu led an army to retake Bozhou, the Đỗ family gathered 30,000 men, including contingents from Nanzhao to attack the Tang. When Li Hu returned, he learned the Viet rebels and Nanzhao had taken control over Annan out of his hand. In December 860, Songping fell to the rebels and Hu fled to Yongzhou. In summer 861, Li Hu retook Songping but Nanzhao forces moved around and seized Yongzhou. Hu was banished to Hainan island and was replaced by Wang Kuan.

=== 6th Nanzhao (863–866) ===
In 863, Nanzhao returned with an invasion force numbering 50,000 with the aid of the local people and besieged Annan's capital Songping in mid-January. On 20 January, the defenders led by Cai Xi killed a hundred of the besiegers. Five days later, Cai Xi captured, tortured, and killed a group of enemies known as the Puzi Man. A local official named Liang Ke was related to them and defected as a result. On 28 January, an enemy Buddhist monk, possibly Indian, was wounded by an arrow while strutting to and fro naked outside the southern walls. On 14 February, Cai Xi shot down 200 enemies and over 30 horses using a mounted crossbow from the walls. By 28 February, most of Cai Xi's followers had perished, and he himself had been wounded several times by arrows and stones. The enemy commander, Yang Sijin, penetrated the inner city. Cai Xi tried to escape by boat, but it capsized midstream, drowning him. The 400 remaining defenders wanted to flee as well, but could not find any boats, so they chose to make a last stand at the eastern gate. Ambushing a group of enemy cavalry, they killed over 2,000 enemy troops and 300 horses before Yang sent reinforcements from the inner city. After taking Songping, on 20 June Nanzhao laid siege to Junzhou (modern Haiphong). A Nanzhao and rebel fleet of 4,000 men led by a Thổ chief named Chu Đạo Cổ (Zhu Daogu, 朱道古) was attacked by a local commander, who rammed their vessels and sank 30 boats, drowning them. In total, the invasion destroyed Chinese armies in Annan numbering over 150,000. Although initially welcomed by the local Viets in ousting Tang control, Nanzhao turned on them, ravaging the local population and countryside. Both Chinese and Vietnamese sources note that the Viets fled to the mountains to avoid destruction. A government-in-exile for the protectorate was established in Haimen (near modern-day Hạ Long) with Song Rong in charge. Ten thousand soldiers from Shandong and all other armies of the empire were called and concentrated at Halong Bay for reconquering Annan. A supply fleet of 1,000 ships from Fujian was organized.

The Tang launched a counterattack in 864 under Gao Pian, a general who had made his reputation fighting the Türks and the Tanguts in the north, with 5,000 troops and experienced initial success against Nanzhao, however political machinations at court led to Gao Pian's recall. In September 865, Gao Pian's forces surprised a Nanzhao army of 50,000 when they were collecting rice from the villages. Gao captured large quantities of rice, which he used to feed his army. In the meantime, Gao had been reinforced by 7,000 men who arrived overland under the command of Wei Zhongzai. In early 866, Gao Pian's 12,000 men defeated a fresh Nanzhao army and chased them back to the mountains. After his recall, he was later reinstated and completed the retaking of Songping in fall 866, executing the enemy general, Duan Qiuqian, and beheading 30,000 of his men. Gao Pian renamed Annan to Jinghai Jun (lit. Peaceful Sea Army). More than half of local rebels fled into the mountains.

=== 7th Nanzhao (869–877) ===
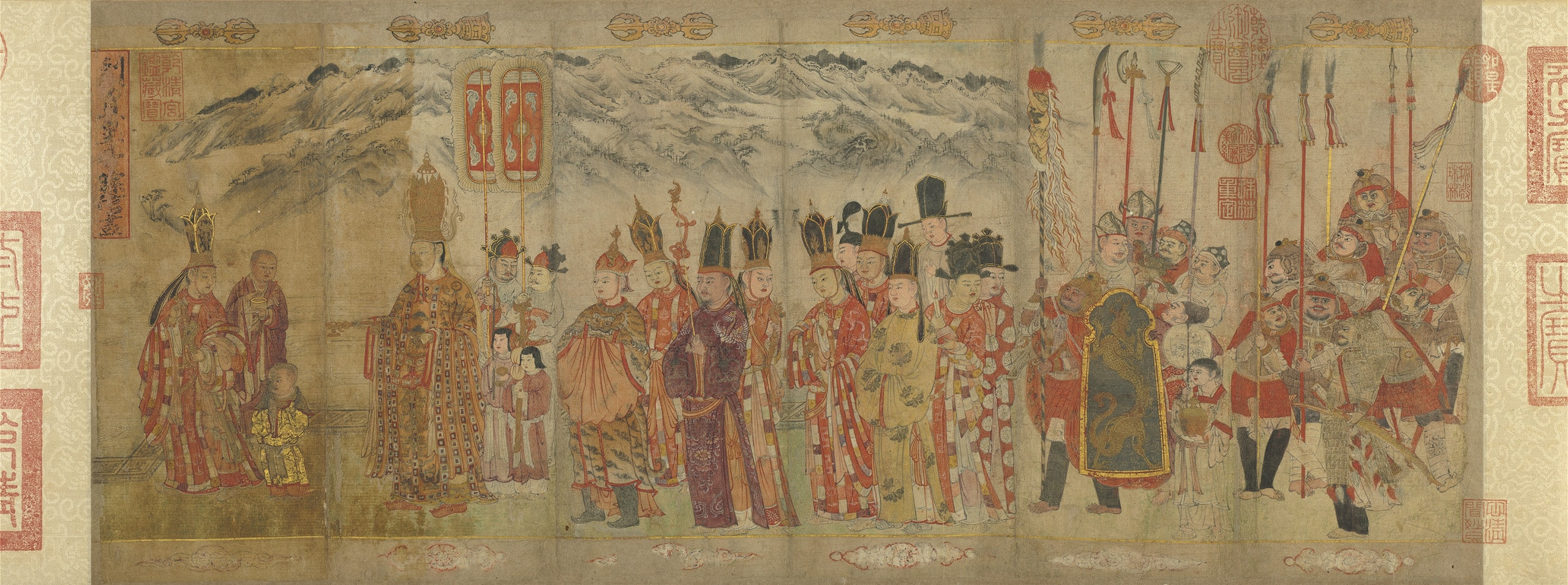
Depiction of Dali Kingdom (Nanzhao's successor) soldiers

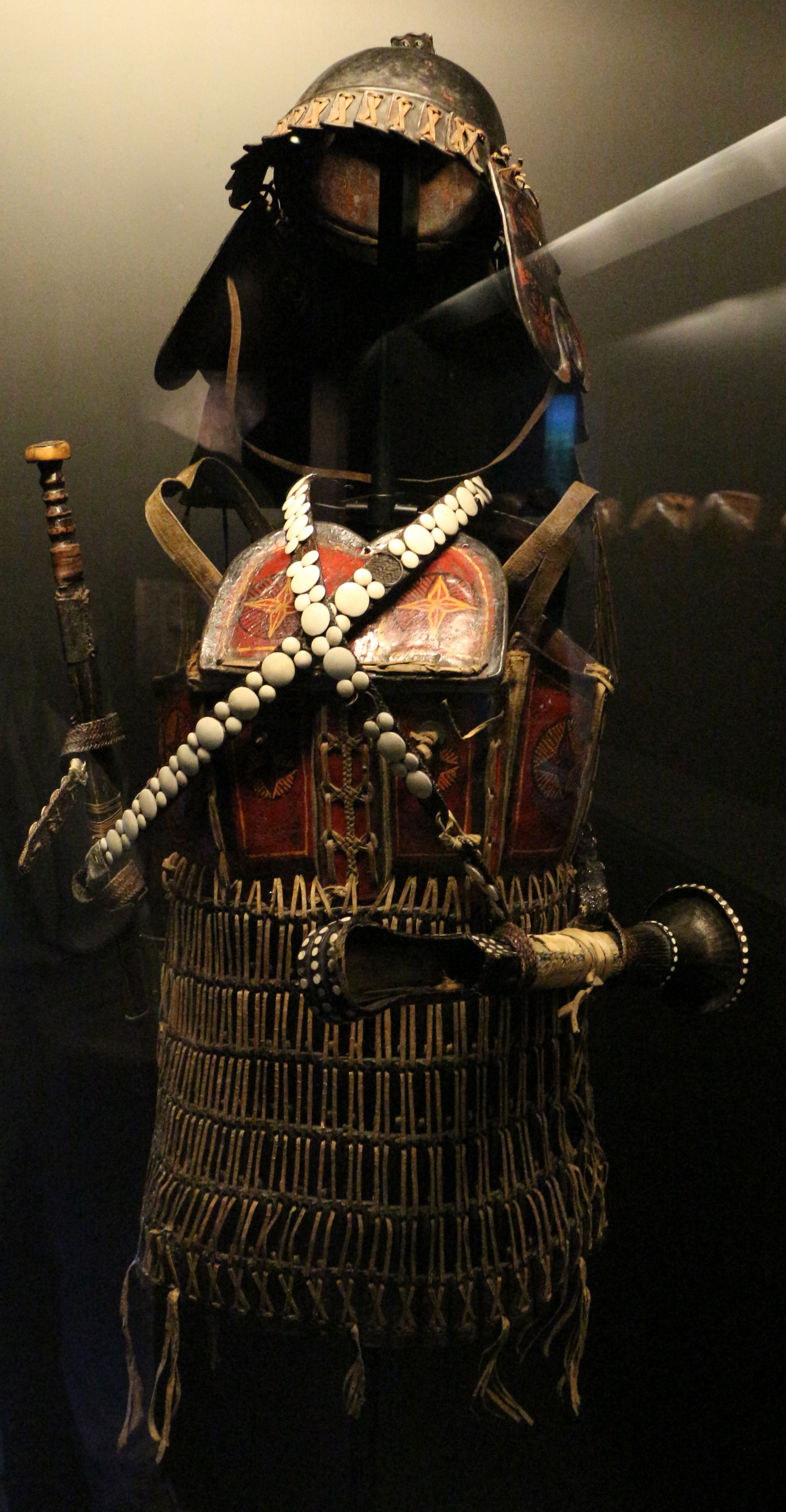
Armour of the Yi people, Qing dynasty

In 869, Nanzhao attacked Chengdu with the help of the Dongman tribe. The Dongman used to be an ally of the Tang during their wars against the Tibetan Empire in the 790s. Their service was rewarded by mistreatment by Yu Shizhen, the governor of Xizhou, who kidnapped Dongman tribesmen and sold them to other tribes. When the Nanzhao attacked Xizhou, the Dongman tribe opened the gates and welcomed them in.

The battle for Chengdu was brutal and protracted. The Nanzhao soldiers used scaling ladders and battering rams to attack the city from four directions. The Tang defenders used hooks and ropes to immobilize the attackers before showering them with oil and setting them on fire. The 3,000 commandos that Lu Dan had earlier handpicked were particularly brave and skillful in battle. They killed and wounded some 2,000 enemy soldiers and burned three thousand pieces of war equipment. After the frontal attacks failed, the Nanzhao troops changed their tactics. They dismantled the bamboo fences of nearby residential houses, wet them with water, and shaped them into a huge cage that could ward off stones, arrows, and fire. They then put this “bamboo tank” on logs and rolled it near the foot of the city wall. Hiding themselves in the cage, they started digging a tunnel. But the Tang soldiers also had a novel weapon waiting for them. They filled jars with human waste and threw them at the attackers. The foul smell made the cage an impossible place to hide and work. Jars filled with molten iron then fell on the cage, turning it into a giant furnace. The invaders, however, refused to give up. They escalated their operations by night attacks. In response, the Tang soldiers lit up the city wall with a thousand torches, thus effectively foiling the enemy’s plan.

Fierce battles in Chengdu had now lasted over a month. Zhixiang, the Tang envoy, believed that it was time to send a messenger to contact Shilong and let him know that peace was in the interest of both parties. He instructed Lu Dan to stop new initiatives against the enemy so that a peace talk with Nanzhao could proceed. Shilong responded positively to the Tang proposal and sent an envoy to fetch Zhixiang to Nanzhao for further negotiation. Unfortunately, a piece of misinformation derailed Zhixiang’s plan. The Tang soldiers believed that reinforcement had arrived at the suburbs of Chengdu to rescue them. They opened the city gate and dashed out to greet the relief troops. This sudden event puzzled the Nanzhao generals, who mistook it for a Tang attack and ordered a counteroffensive. Tangled fighting broke out in the morning and lasted into dusk. Nanzhao’s action also puzzled Zhixiang. He questioned Shilong’s envoy: “The Son of Heaven has decreed that Nanzhao make peace [with China], but your soldiers have just raided Chengdu. Why?” He then requested withdrawal of the Nanzhao soldiers as the prerequisite for his visit to Shilong. Zhixiang eventually canceled his visit. His subordinates convinced him that the visit would subject him to mortal danger because the “barbarians are deceitful.” This cancellation only convinced Shilong that Tang lacked sincerity in seeking peace. He resumed attacks on Chengdu but could not score a decisive victory.

The situation in Chengdu changed in favor of the defenders when Yan Qingfu, military governor of Jiannan East Circuit (Jiannan dongchuan), coordinated a rescue operation. On the eleventh day of the second month, Yan’s troops arrived at Xindu (present-day Xindu County), which was some 22 kilometers north of the besieged Chengdu. Shilong hurriedly diverted some of his forces to intercept the Tang troops, but he suffered a crushing defeat. Some two thousand Nanzhao soldiers were killed. Two days later, another Tang force arrived to inflict even greater casualties on Shilong. Five thousand soldiers were exterminated, and the rest retreated to a nearby mountain. The Tang force advanced to Tuojiang, a relay station merely 15 kilometers north of Chengdu. Now it was Shilong who anxiously sued for peace. But Zhixiang was in no hurry to make a deal with him: “You should first lift the siege and withdraw your troops.” A few days later, a Nanzhao envoy came again. He shuttled ten times between Shilong and Zhixiang in the same day, trying to work out an agreement, but to no avail. With the Tang reinforcement fast approaching Chengdu, Shilong knew that time was working against him. His soldiers intensified attacks on the city. Shilong was so desperate to complete the campaign that he risked his life and personally supervised operations on the front line. But it was too late. On the eighteenth day, the Tang rescue forces converged on Chengdu and engaged their enemy. That night, Shilong decided to abort his campaign.

— Wang Zhenping

Nanzhao invaded again in 874 and reached within 70 km of Chengdu, seizing Qiongzhou, however they ultimately retreated, being unable to take the capital.

Your ancestor once served the Tibetans as a slave. The Tibetans should be your foes. Instead you have turned yourself into a Tibetan subject. How could you not even differentiate kindness from enmity? As for the hall of the former Lord of Shu, it is a treasure from the previous dynasty, not a place suitable for occupancy by you remote barbarians. [Your aggression] has angered the deities as well as the common people. Your days are numbered!

— Niu Cong, military governor of Chengdu, in response to the Nanzhao invasion of 873

In 875, Gao Pian was appointed by the Tang to lead defenses against Nanzhao. He ordered all the refugees in Chengdu to return home. Gao led a force of 5,000 and chased the remaining Nanzhao troops to the Dadu River where he defeated them in a decisive battle, captured their armored horses, and executed 50 tribal leaders. He proposed to the court an invasion of Nanzhao with 60,000 troops. His proposal was rejected. Nanzhao forces were driven from the Bozhou region, modern Guizhou, in 877 by a local military force organized by the Yang family from Shanxi. This effectively ended Nanzhao's expansionist campaigns. Shilong died in 877.

== Annan ==
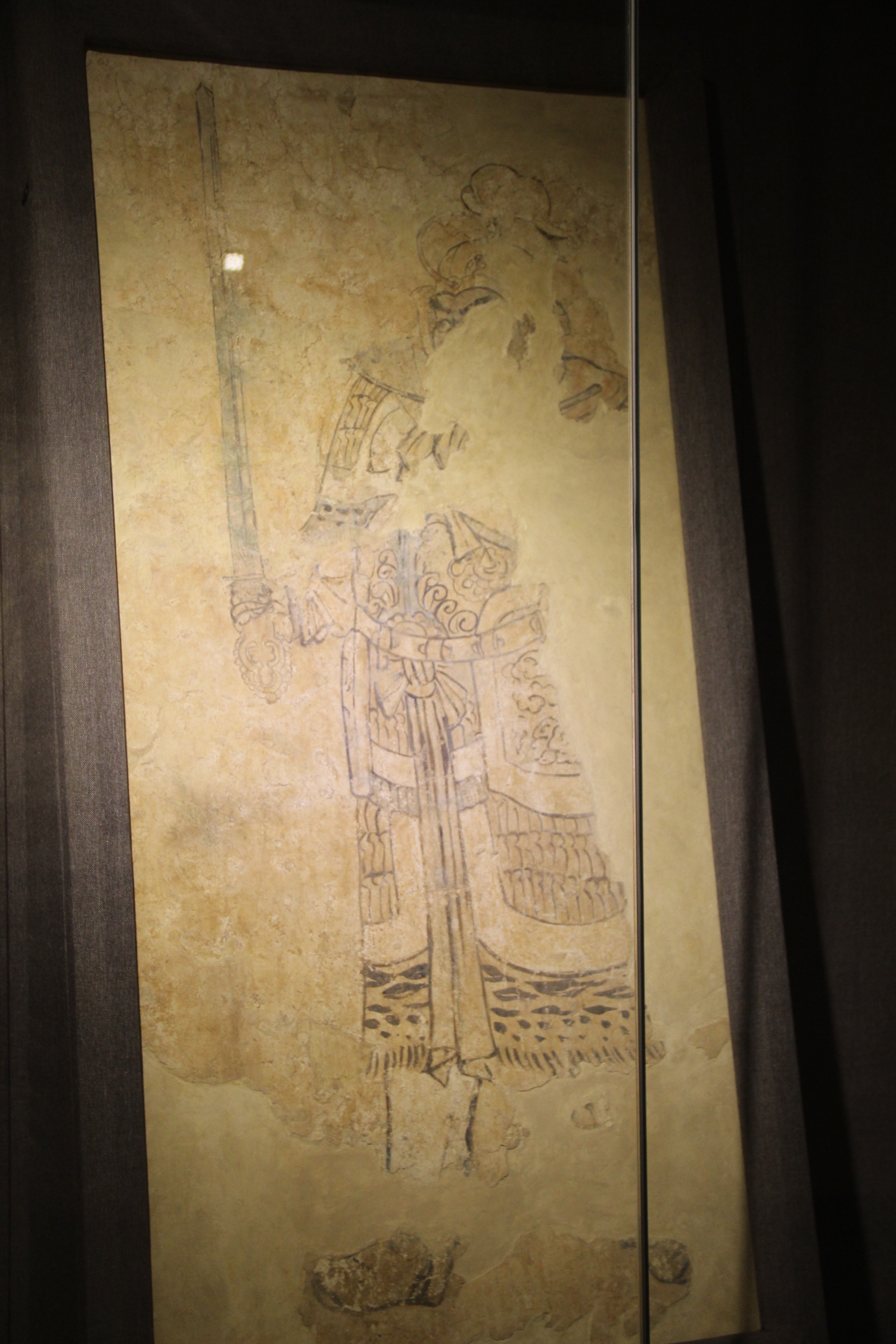
Tang dynasty tomb guardian wearing lamellar armour

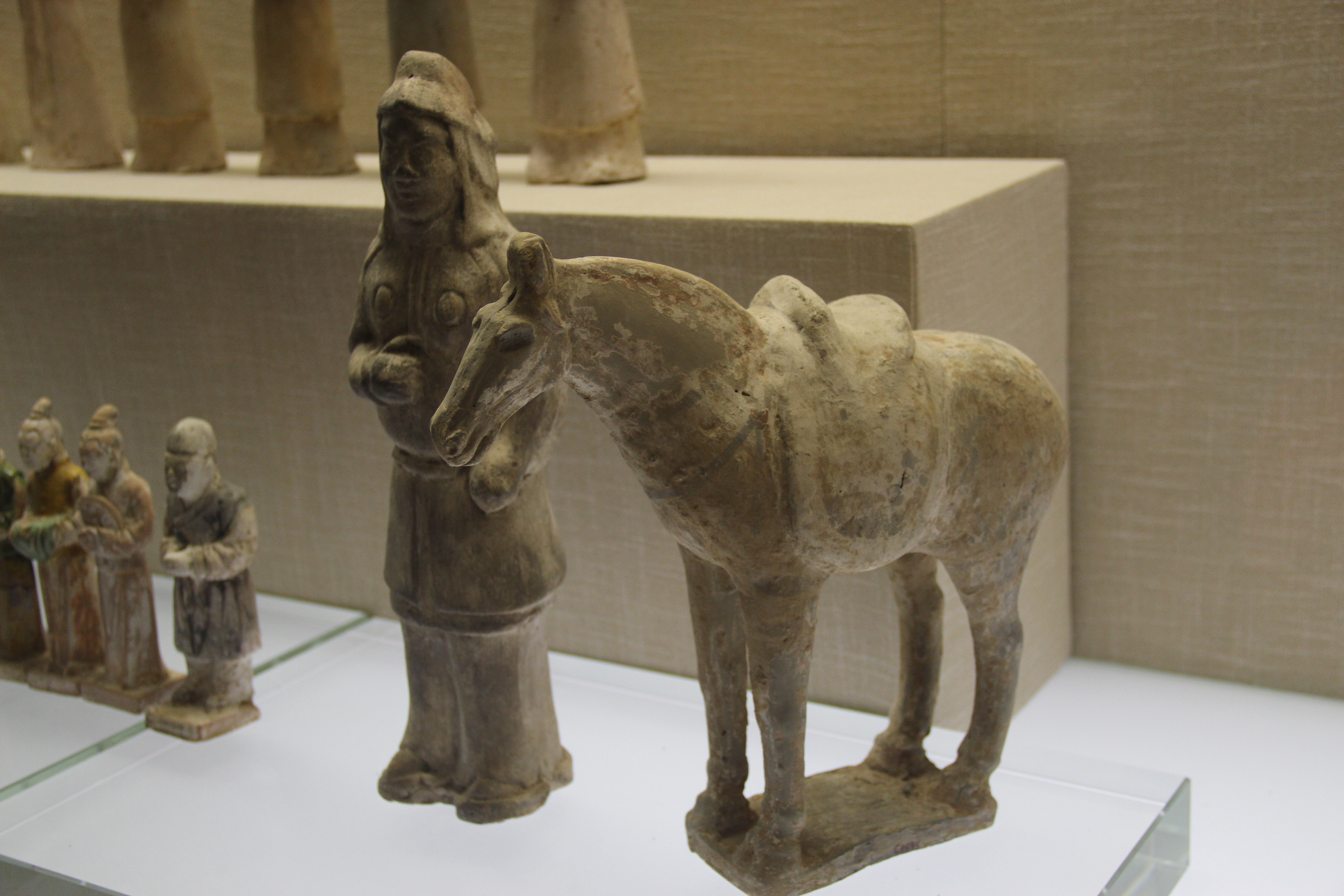
Soldier and horse, Tang dynasty

Annan was the southernmost region of Tang Empire, where the main inhabitants were Viets.

=== Lý Tự Tiên (687) ===
In 687, Lý Tự Tiên and Đinh Kiến rebelled at Songping in response to a raise in harvest tax.

=== Mai Thúc Loan (722) ===
In 722, Mai Thúc Loan rebelled in what is now Hà Tĩnh Province and proclaimed himself the "Swarthy Emperor" (Hắc Đẽ). His rebellion rallied people from 23 counties with "400,000 followers". Many were peasants who roamed the countryside, plundering food and other items. He also allied with Champa and Chenla, an unknown kingdom named Jinlin (“Gold Neighbor”) and other unnamed kingdoms. A Chinese army of 100,000 from Guangdong under general Yang Zixu, including a "multitude" of mountain tribesmen who had remained loyal to the Tang, marched directly along the coast, following the old road built by Ma Yuan. Yang Zixu attacked Mai Thúc Loan by surprise and suppressed the rebellion in 723. The corpses of the Swarthy Emperor and his followers were piled up to form a huge mound and were left on public display to check further revolts.

=== Srivijaya (767) ===
In 767, Srivijaya fleets invaded Annan and are defeated.

=== Phùng Hưng (785–791) ===
In 785, chieftains of the Annamese, Đỗ Anh Hàn, Phùng Hưng and Phùng An rebelled, due to Chinese governor Gao Zhengping's doubling of taxes. Tang forces retook Annan in 791.

=== Champa (803) ===
In 803,Champa seized southern Annan. Troops working on garrison fortifications also revolted. From 803 to 863, local rebels killed or expelled no fewer than six protector-generals of Annan.

=== Dương Thanh (820–837) ===
In 820, Dương Thanh seized Songping but the Tang regained control in 837.

=== Yongzhou (823–827) ===
From 823 to 826, the Huang and Nung people, aided with raiders from Champa attacked Yongzhou, and seized 18 counties. The "Nung Grottoes" sought aid from Nanzhao.

=== Annan (858–861) ===
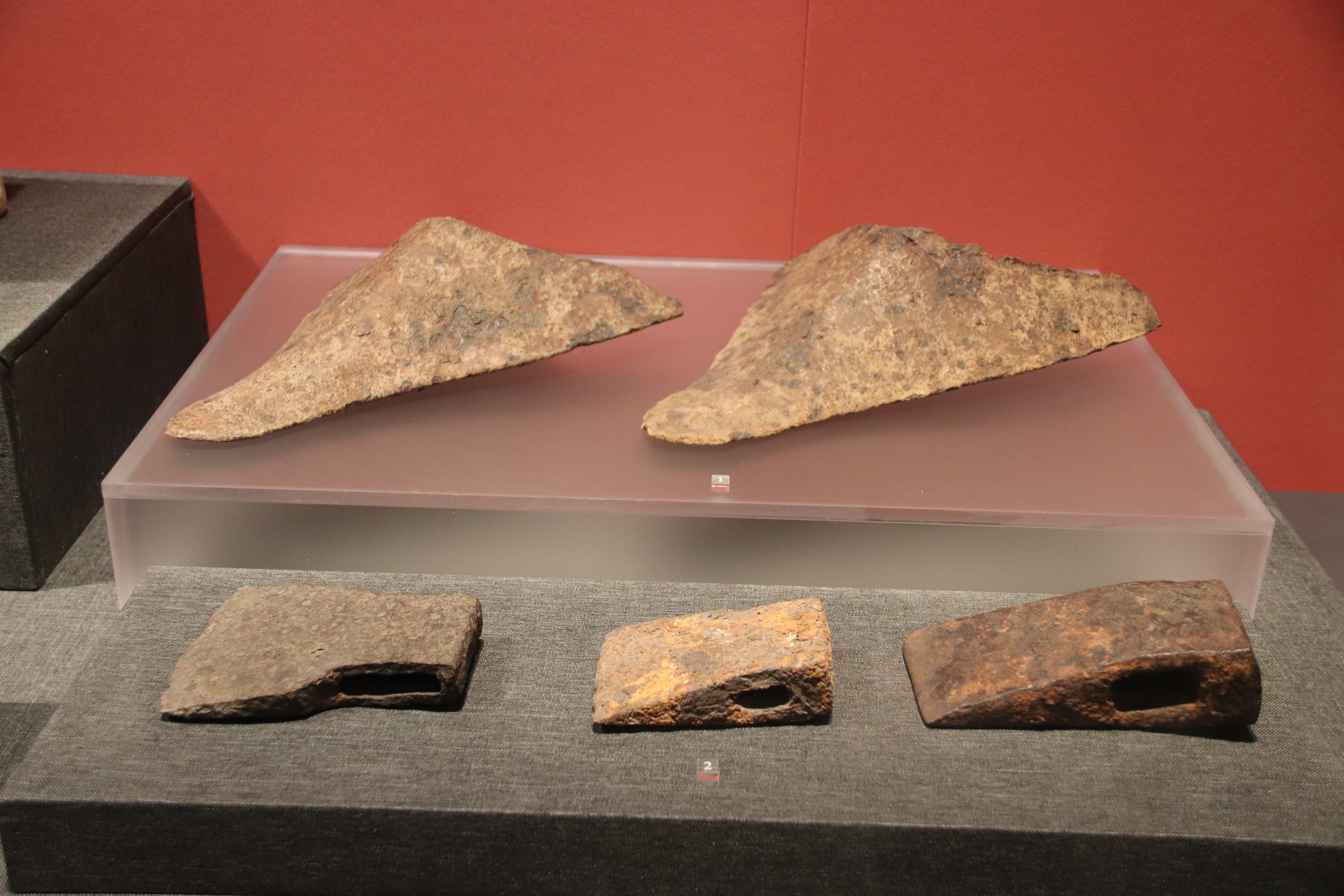
Iron axes and ploughshares, Tang dynasty

When Li Zhuo became jiedushi of Annan in 854, he reduced the amount of salt traded to the mountain chiefs in the west in exchange for horses. The mountains chiefs responded by launching raids on Chinese garrisons. In the next year, Li Zhuo killed the Aizhou (Nghệ An, central Vietnam) chieftain Đỗ Tồn Thành, who was a military commander and had been causing him trouble. He also killed the chieftain of the Qidong Man in Aizhou. The Đỗ tribe had been a powerful Viet family in Thanh Hoá and Nghệ An since the 5-6th century. These actions provoked the natives into an alliance with Nanzhao. Fan Chuo, a Tang official in Annan reported: "…The native chiefs within the frontiers were subsequently seduced by the Man rebels…" and "again became close friends with them. As days passed and months came, we gradually had to encounter raids and sudden attacks. This caused a number of places to fall into rebel hands."

Nanzhao armies did not appear until 858. In the meantime, local chiefs led raids that brought warfare to villages in the heart of the protectorate. In 857, Song Ya was sent to Annan to deal with the situation, but was recalled to deal with another rebellion after only two months. His replacement, Li Hongfu, only had nominal control over the protectorate, which was actually controlled by La Hanh Cung, who commanded 2,000 well trained soldiers. In 858, the Tang court sent a new jiedushi, Wang Shi, to protect Annan. He banished La Hanh Cung, saw off a Nanzhao reconnaissance force, and defeated an invasion by the mountain tribes. The Tang garrisons were upgraded with heavy-armored cavalry and infantry and Songping was fortified with a reed palisade. In the same year, a serious rebellion broke out in Yongzhou. The situation in Yongzhou threatened land communication between Annan and the empire, so a special army was established there to deal with rebels and to insure communications. This army was called the Yellow Head Army, for the soldiers wore yellow bands around their heads. In early autumn, local people were agitated by a rumor that the Yellow Head Army had embarked to attack them by surprise. One evening they surrounded Songping and demanded that Wang Shi return north and allow them to fortify the city against the Yellow Head Army. Wang Shi was eating his evening meal when this commotion broke out. It is reported that, paying no heed to the mutineers, he leisurely finished his meal. Then, dressed in his battle gear, he appeared on the wall with his generals and admonished the crowd of rebels, who dispersed. The next morning, Wang Shi's troops captured and beheaded some ringleaders of the affair.

In 860, Wang Shi was recalled to deal with a rebellion elsewhere. The new jiedushi, Li Hu, arrived at Songping and executed Đỗ Tồn Thành's son, Đỗ Thủ Trừng, who according to Chinese sources was involved in the mutiny years earlier, probably due to the death of his father at the hands of Li Zhuo four years earlier. This alienated many of the powerful local clans of Annan. Anti-Tang Viets allied with highland people, who appealed to Nanzhao for help, and as a result invaded the area in 860, briefly taking Songping before being driven out by a Tang army the next year. Prior to Li Hu's arrival, Nanzhao had already seized Bozhou. When Li Hu led an army to retake Bozhou, the Đỗ family gathered 30,000 men, including contingents from Nanzhao to attack the Tang. When Li Hu returned, he learned the Viet rebels and Nanzhao had taken control of Annan. On 17 January 861, Songping fell to the rebels and Li Hu fled to Yongzhou. In 861, Li Hu retook Songping on 21 July but Nanzhao forces moved around and seized Yongzhou. Li Hu was banished to Hainan island and was replaced by Wang Kuan. Wang Kuan and the Tang court sought local cooperation by recognizing the power of the Đỗ family, granting a posthumous title to Đỗ Tồn Thành along with an apology for the deaths of him and his son and an admission that Li Hu had exceeded his authority.

=== Annan (874–879) ===
A campaign against local aboriginals in Annan was conducted from 874 to 879.

=== Guangxi (877) ===
In 877, troops deployed from Annan in Guangxi mutined.

=== Annan (880) ===
In 880, the army in Annan mutinied, took the city of Đại La, and forced the military commissioner Zeng Gun to flee, ending de facto Chinese control in Vietnam.

== An Lushan Rebellion (755–763) ==
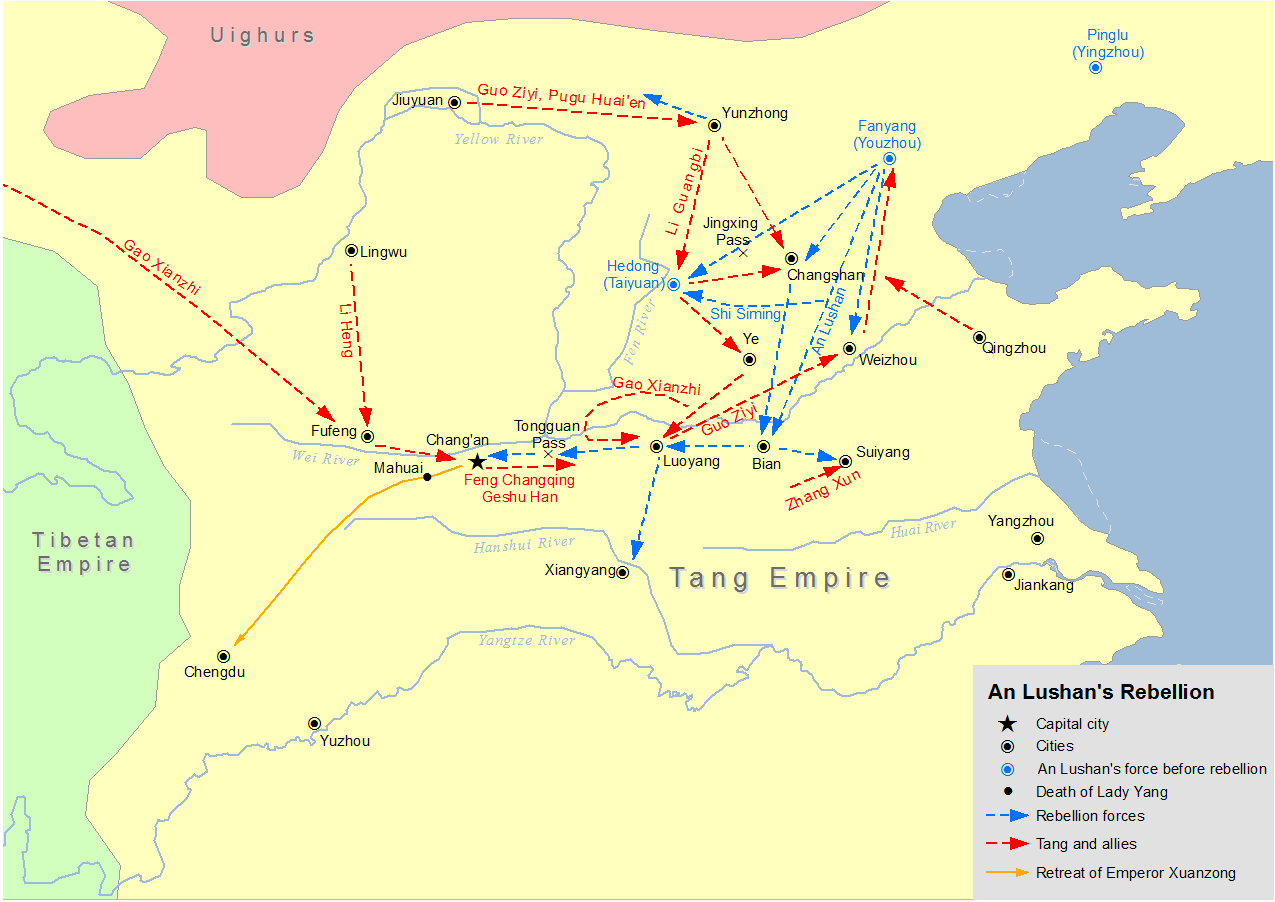
An Lushan Rebellion, 755–763

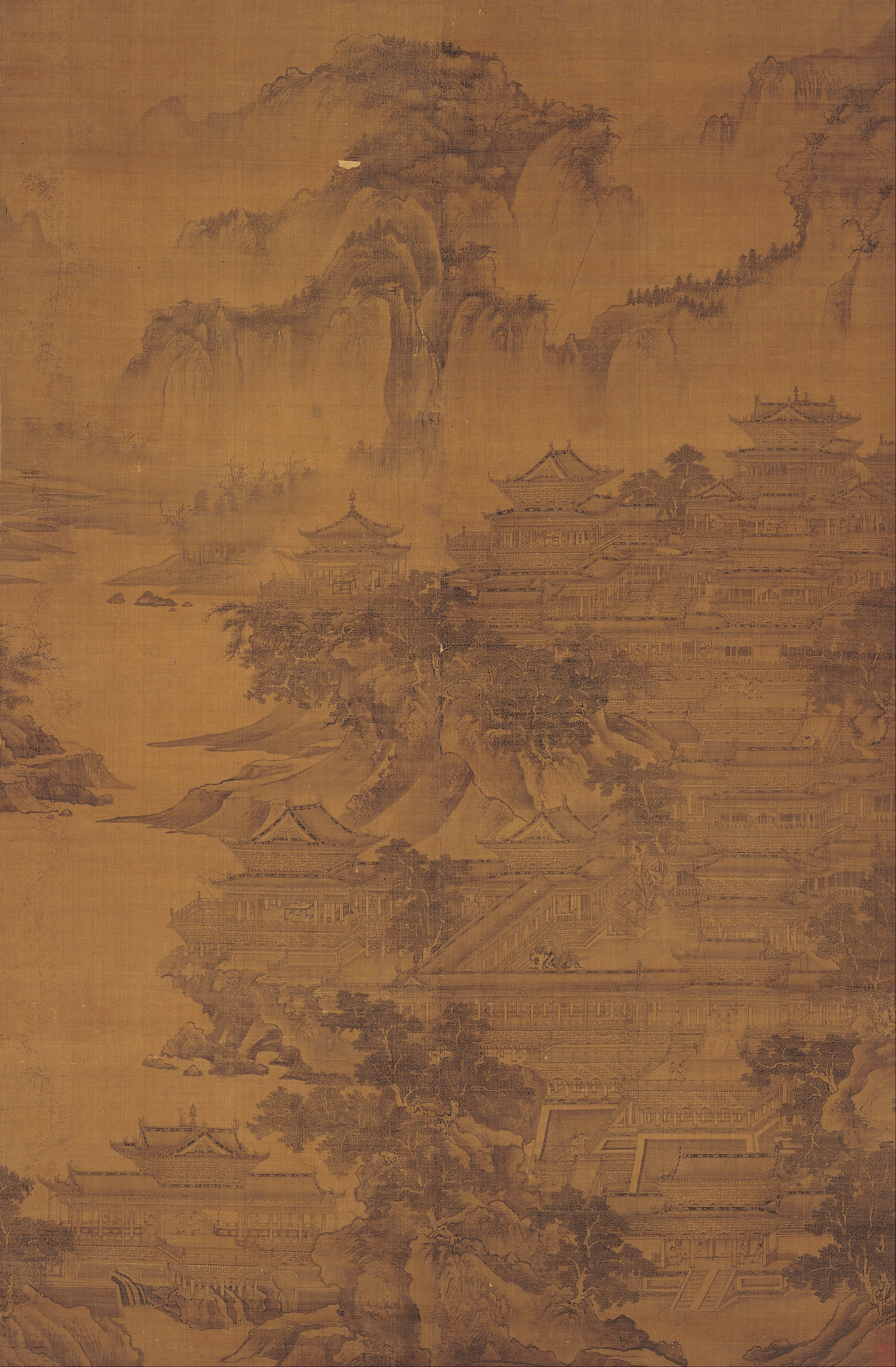
Summer Palace of Emperor Ming (明皇避暑宮) by Guo Zhongshu (929-977), collection of Osaka City Museum of Fine Arts.

=== An Lushan (755–757) ===
An Lushan was the son of a Turkish mother and Sogdian father. Their family fled to the Tang in 716 due to turmoil in the Second Turkic Khaganate.

Illiterate in Chinese, An Lushan nonetheless rose to become a prominent military commander in the Tang military. By 733, An had become a deputy under Youzhou governor Zhang Shougui. In 742, An became jiedushi of Pinglu. In 744, An also became jiedushi of Youzhou (Fanyang). In 751, An was given command of Hedong.

When the chancellor Yang Guozhong started arresting An's supporters in the capital in 755, An rose in revolt under the pretense of having received a secret edict to suppress Yang.

An marched south with 150,000 men from his base in Youzhou on 16 December 755. News of the rebellion reached the capital on 22 December. Emperor Xuanzong of Tang immediately sent order to raise soldiers in Hedong and Luoyang with Feng Changqing in overall command. An crossed the Yellow River northeast of Luoyang on 8 January 756. Feng attempted to block An at Hulao Pass with 60,000 soldiers, but his hastily raised army could not stand up to An's elite cavalry, who trampled them under their hooves. After two more battles, Feng fled west to Shanzhou and An took Luoyang on 19 January 756.

Feng was joined by Gao Xianzhi, who commanded another 50,000 troops, but they decided to withdraw from Shanzhou and retreat to the more defensible Tong Pass. However the retreat degenerated into a confused and panicked flight. Gao's eunuch supervisor Bian Lingcheng denounced the commanders and had them put to death on Xuanzong's orders.

Gao and Feng's troops were joined by 80,000 soldiers recalled from the frontier under the command of Geshu Han. Together, an army around 200,000 strong now stood guard at Tong Pass, blocking An's way to Chang'an.

On 5 February, An Lushan proclaimed himself Emperor of Yan. In the same month, Tang loyalists under the leadership of Li Guangbi rebelled against An in Hebei. An sent Shi Siming against the rebels. Shi raced ahead of the main army with his mounted troops to intercept Li Guangbi's Shuofang army near the town of Changshan. Li took Changshan in advance and set up his men with their backs to the town walls to prevent a sneak attack. The spearmen formed a dense defensive formation while 1,000 crossbowmen divided into four sections to provide continuous volley fire. When Shi's cavalry engaged Li's Shuofang army they were completely unable to close in on his troops and suffered heavy losses, forcing a withdrawal. In May, Li was joined by the new jiedushi of Shuofang, Guo Ziyi, and besieged Shi at Boling.

In the summer of 756, Yang Guozhong convinced Xuanzong to order Geshu Han to take the offensive against An. On 5 July, the Tang army marched toward Shanzhou. On 7 July, the Tang met the rebels in battle and were defeated. The Tang sent in their vanguard, who were lured into a narrow defile where it became impossible for them to use their weapons. The rebel Tongluo cavalry attacked them from the rear, causing mass panic in the main army, which dissolved into a rout. The rebels followed up by taking the Tong Pass and capturing Geshu Han, who was sent to Luoyang.

On 12 August, Xuanzong fled for Chengdu. When they reached the Mawei post station, the soldiers accompanying him forced him to have both Yang Guozhong and Yang Guifei put to death. The rebels took Chang'an soon after.

On the same day Xuanzong fled Chang'an, the crown prince Li Heng declared himself emperor (posthumously Emperor Suzong of Tang) at Lingwu. The Shuofang army abandoned their campaign in Hebei and marched west to protect their new emperor.

Despite taking Chang'an, An Lushan's forces failed to make any headway in the south. Major towns such as Yingchuan, Suiyang, and Nanyang resisted all attempts to capture them.

In early 757, An Lushan was killed by his close associates, who installed his son An Qingxu as the new emperor.

=== An Qingxu (757–759) ===
On 29 October 757, a Tang-Uyghur army under the command of Guo Ziyi marched for Chang'an. On 13 November, the Tang engaged in battle with the rebels near Xiangji Temple. The rebels were initially successful in driving back the Tang line and throwing them into confusion, but the Tang counterattacked from the rear with a contingent of Uyghur cavalry under Pugu Huaien. When the rebel cavalry forces were defeated, Pugu launched an attack on the primary body of the rebel army, defeating them. The Tang recovered Chang'an on 14 November.

The rebels tried to stop the Tang advance on Luoyang in the narrow defiles where Geshu Han had previously been defeated, but the Tang routed them on 30 November and entered Luoyang on 3 December. An Qingxu fled to southern Hebei.

In November 758, the Tang launched another campaign against An and laid siege to him in Xiangzhou (Anyang). On 7 April 759, Shi Siming attacked the Tang army, but a large dust storm broke off the engagement. While Shi was able to recover fairly quickly, the storm sent a wave of confusion throughout the large Tang army. Each Tang commander decided to retreat in a different direction to their own territory.

On 10 April, Shi Siming killed An Qingxu.

=== Shi Siming (759–761) ===
In the fall of 759, Shi Siming captured Luoyang, whose commander Li Guangbi decided to retreat to a more defensive position at Heyang, northeast of Luoyang. The situation remained static for three years, with neither side able to make any headway against the other. Shi Siming was killed by his son, Shi Chaoyi, in the spring of 761.

=== Shi Chaoyi (761–763) ===
In the fall of 762, the Tang launched a two pronged attack on Shi Chaoyi in Luoyang. Pugu Huai'en and Li Guangbi defeated the rebels in November and Shi fled east, but his subordinate generals refused to harbor him. One by one, the rebel generals submitted to nominal Tang authority while still retaining control of their territory and armies, effectively becoming autonomous kingdoms within the empire of the Tang. Shi Chaoyi committed suicide in 763, putting an end to the rebellion started by An Lushan in 755.

== Warlords (Jiedushi) ==
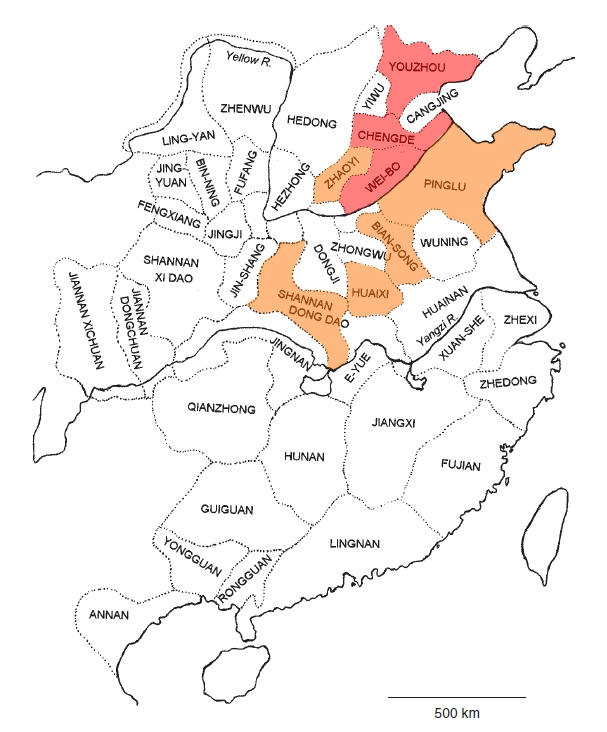
Rebellious provinces in the post-An Lushan Tang Empire. Red provinces were lost to the Tang forever while the orange provinces were reincorporated.

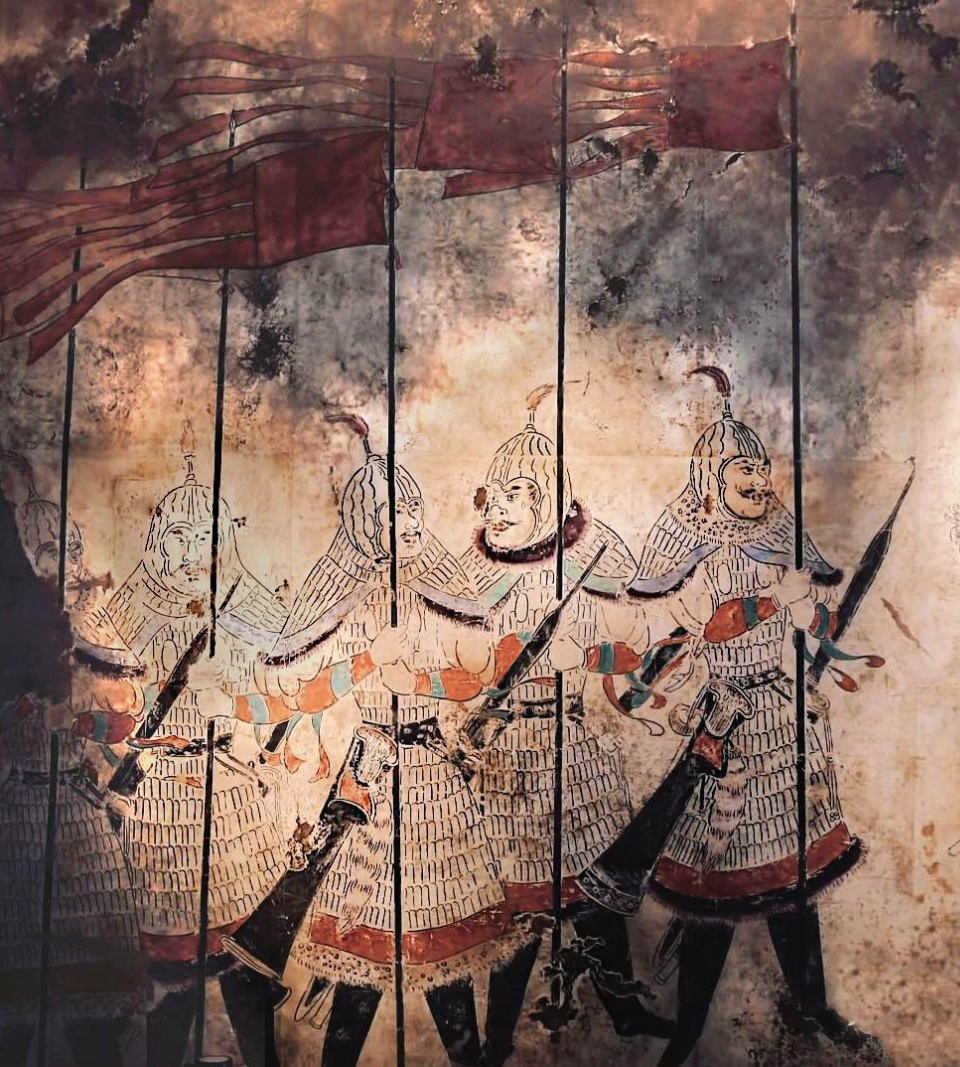
Elite Tang soldiers in a tomb mural, 644 AD

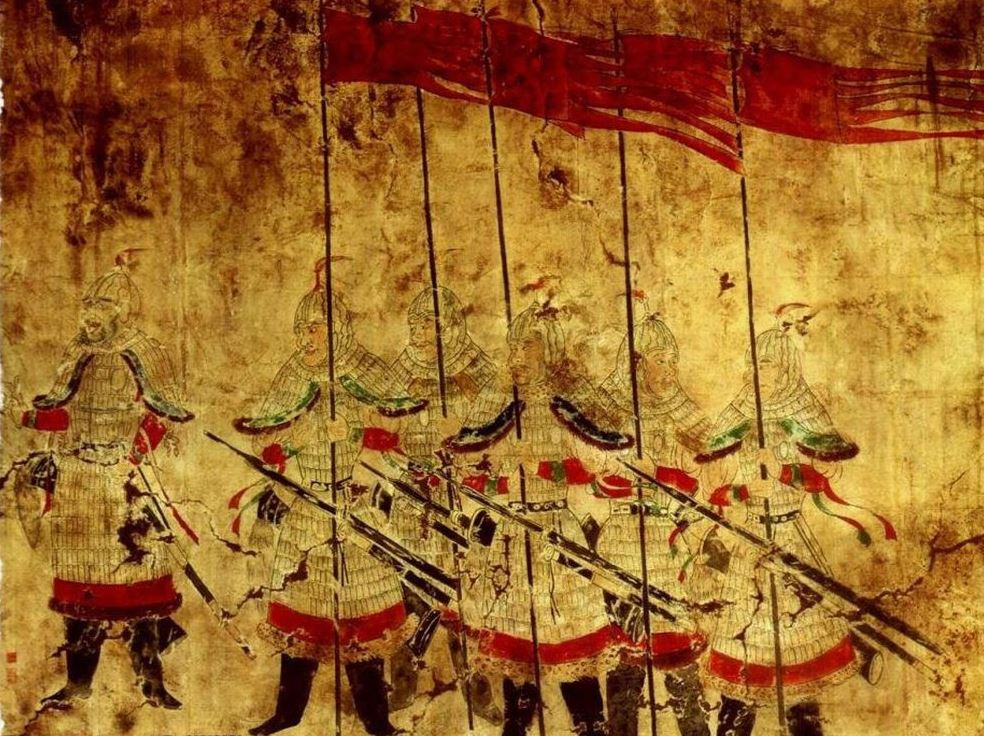
Elite Tang soldiers in a tomb mural, 644 AD

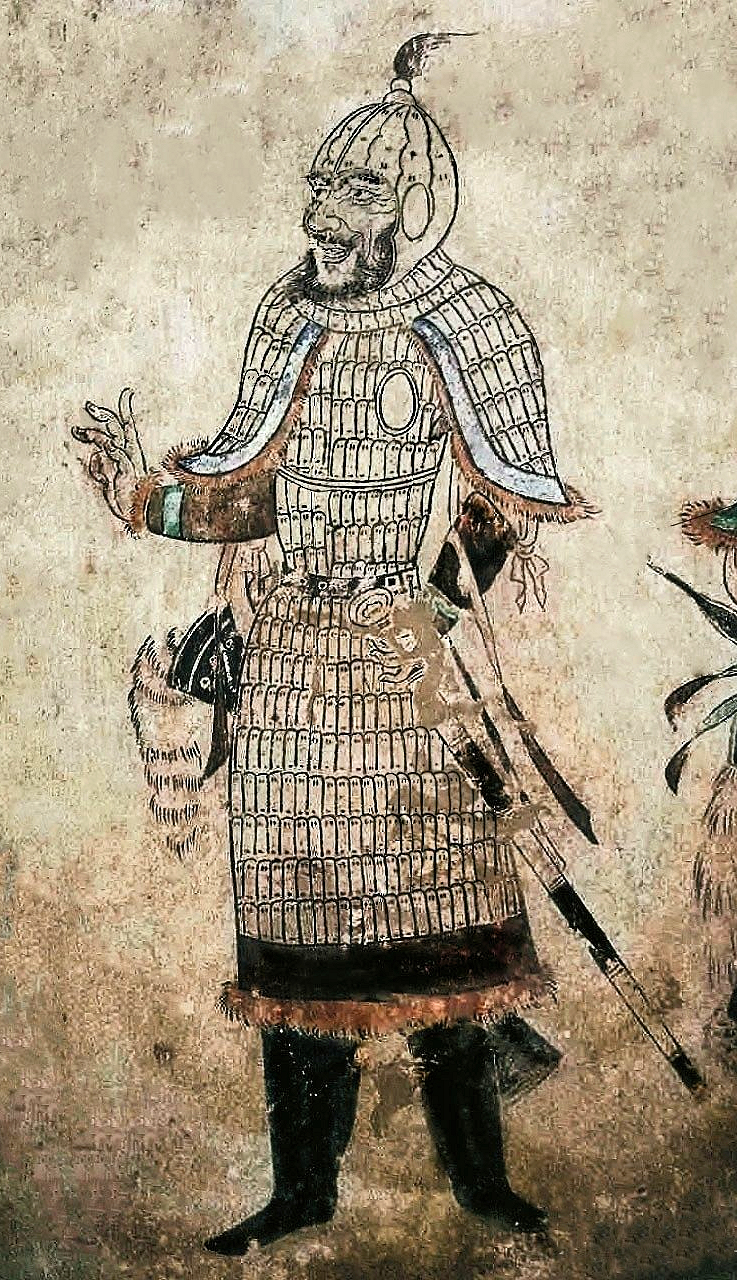
Tang Imperial guard in lamellar armour

In the post-An Lushan Tang empire, approximately 75% of all provincial governors were military men regardless of their titles and designations. Four of them were former rebels in Hebei. In return for their surrender, they were allowed to remain in command of their armies and to govern their own land as they saw fit. They were Zhaoyi (modern Changzhi), Youzhou (modern Beijing), Chengde, and Weibo. The provincial governors in Pinglu (Shandong) and Huaixi (Zhangyi) started out as a loyalists but joined the former rebels as autonomous powers. In 775, Tian Chengsi of Weibo attacked and absorbed a large portion of Xiangzhou from Zhaoyi, resulting in the Three Fanzhen of Hebei. Although nominally subordinate to the Tang by accepting imperial titles, these former rebels governed their territories as independent fiefdoms with all the trappings of feudal society, establishing their own family dynasties through systematic intermarriage, collecting taxes, raising armies, and appointing their own officials.

From the time of Qin and Han and the Six Dynasties there had been rebellious generals but no such thing as rebellious soldiers. After the middle years of the Tang, however, mutinies in the provincial garrisons happened all the time.

— Zhao Yi

=== Chengde ===
Chengde was ruled by Li Baochen, a man of Kumo Xi origins. He was succeeded by his son Li Weiyue in 781, but he was killed by the Khitan Wang Wujun in 782. Wang Wujun was succeeded by his son Wang Shizhen in 801. Shizhen was succeeded by his son Wang Chengzong in 809. In 809, the Tang attacked Chengde. The invasion ended in failure and peace was restored in 810. Chengzong was succeeded by his brother Wang Chengyuan in 820. Chengyuan abdicated and acquiesced to imperial control. However the court appointed governor of Chengde, Tian Hongzheng, was killed by the Uyghur Wang Tingcou in 821. Tingcou was succeeded by his son Wang Yuankui in 834. Yuankai was succeeded by his son Wang Shaoding in 855. Shaoding grew ill and died in 857, and was succeeded by his brother Wang Shaoyi. Shaoyi died in 866 and was succeeded by his nephew Wang Jingchong. Jingchong was succeeded by his son Wang Rong in 883. Wang Rong's state of Zhao was destroyed in 921 when he was killed in a coup by his adopted son Zhang Wenli, who in turn died soon after. Wenli's son Zhang Chujin was captured by Li Cunxu the next year. The people of Zhao hated the Zhang family and requested that his family be turned into minced meat. Chujin was dismembered at the marketplace.

=== Weibo ===
Tian Chengsi of Weibo was succeeded by his nephew Tian Yue in 779. Yue was killed by his cousin Tian Xu in 784. Xu was succeeded by his son Tian Ji'an in 796. Tian Ji'an was succeeded by his son Tian Huaijian in 812. On 17 November 812, Tian Huaijian was removed from power and succeeded by a distant relative, Tian Hongzheng. Tian Hongzheng submitted to imperial authority and the court made him jiedushi of Chengde, however he was killed by Wang Tingcou on 29 August 821. The post of Weibo was taken up by Li Su, who grew ill soon after and was replaced by Tian Hongzheng's son, Tian Bu. Tian Bu tried to take vengeance for his father by attacking Chengde, but his soldiers deserted him. He committed suicide on 6 February 822. Shi Xiancheng took over Weibo and eventually submitted to imperial authority. However the soldiers grew angry that Shi was stripping Weibo of its wealth in preparation to move to another imperial post, and killed him on 30 July 829 under the leadership of He Jintao. Jintao was succeeded by his son He Hongjing in 840. Hongjing was succeeded by his son He Quanhao in 866. He Quanhao was killed in a mutiny by soldiers in 870 and replaced by Han Yunzhong. Yunzhong was succeeded by his son Han Jian in 874. Han Jian tried to expand Weibo's territory but failed and was replaced by Le Yanzhen in 883. Le Yanzhen abdicated in 888 and was replaced by Zhao Wenbian, who was killed and replaced by Luo Hongxin. Hongxin was succeeded by his son Luo Shaowei in 898. Shaowei's territory was eventually integrated into Later Liang, and he died as grand preceptor and palace secretary in 910.

The classic example is the Wei-Bo "headquarters guard" (yajun), an elite corps that had been formed by that province’s first military governor, Tian Chengsi. The men of this force, originally 5000 strong, were chosen for their size and strength; they were much better rewarded than the rest of the army, and membership eventually became a hereditary privilege that was passed from father to son. Extremely jealous of their privileges, they came to dominate the politics of Wei-Bo in the ninth century and intervened to install military governors of their own choosing in 812, 822, 829, 870, 883, and 888.

— David Graff

=== Youzhou ===
Li Huaixian of Youzhou (Lulong) was killed by Zhu Xicai in 768. Zhu Xicai was killed by Li Huaiyuan in 772 and replaced by Zhu Ci. In 774, Zhu Ci submitted to Tang authority, but his brother Zhu Tao remained in Youzhou as acting jiedushi. In 783, Zhu Ci rebelled and declared himself emperor in Chang'an but was defeated the next year. Zhu Ci died in 785 and was succeeded by his cousin Liu Peng. Liu Peng died in the same year and was succeeded by his son Liu Ji. Liu Ji was poisoned by his son Liu Zong in 810. In 821, Liu Zong abdicated and became a monk. The court appointee, Zhang Hongjing, was removed in a mutiny and replaced by Zhu Kerong. Zhu Kerong was killed by his soldiers in 826 and replaced with his son Zhu Yansi. Zhu Yansi was killed in the same year by his officer Li Zaiyi. Li Zaiyi was ousted by Yang Zhicheng in 831. Yang Zhicheng was removed from power by his soldiers in 834 and replaced with Shi Yuanzhong. Shi Yuanzhong was killed in 841 and two more followed him in quick succession before Zhang Zhongwu took power in Youzhou. Zhongwu was succeeded by his son Zhang Zhifang in 849. He was immediately ousted by his soldiers and replaced by Zhou Lin. Zhou Lin died the next year and was succeeded by Zhang Yunshen. Yunshen was succeeded by his son Zhang Jianhui in 872. Zhang Jianhui fled to the Tang court in 873 and was succeeded by Zhang Gongsu. Zhang Gongsu was defeated by Li Maoxun in 875. Maoxun abdicated to his son Li Keju in 876. Li Keju was attacked by Li Quanzhong in 885 and committed suicide. Quanzhong was succeeded by his son Li Kuangwei the next year. Kuangwei was overthrown by his brother Li Kuangchou in 893. Li Keyong attacked Youzhou in 894 and forced Li Kuangchou to flee to Yichang (modern Cangzhou). Yichang's governor Lu Yanwei killed Li Kuangchou. Youzhou was given to Liu Rengong. Rengong ruled until 907 when he was overthrown by his son Liu Shouguang. Shouguang's short lived state of Yan was conquered by Li Cunxu in 913.

=== Zhaoyi ===
Xue Song of Zhaoyi (modern Changzhi) was succeeded by his son Xue Ping in 773. Xue Ping immediately abdicated to his brother Xue E. Tian Chengsi of Weibo invaded Zhaoyi in 775, conquering four of its six prefectures. Xue E fled to the Tang court, who took control of the two remaining prefectures.

Liu Wu submitted to imperial authority and was made jiedushi of Zhaoyi in 820. Liu Wu was succeeded by his son Liu Congjian in 825. When Liu Congjian died in 843, imperial forces invaded Zhaoyi and slaughtered his family.

=== Pinglu ===
Li Zhengji of Pinglu was succeeded by his son Li Na in 781. Li Na was succeeded by his son Li Shigu in 792. Shigu was succeeded by his half brother Li Shidao in 806. In 818, imperial forces invaded Pinglu. Li Shidao was killed by his own officer Liu Wu in 819. Liu Wu submitted to imperial authority and was made jiedushi of Zhaoyi (modern Changzhi) in 820.

=== Bian-song (Xuanwu) ===
Bian-song is headquartered in modern Kaifeng.

- Li Lingyao 776
- Li Zhongchen 776
- Liu Xuanzuo 781-792
- Wu Cou 792
- Liu Shining -793
- Li Wanrong 793
- Liu Quanliang -799
- Han Hong 799-819

=== Huaixi (Zhangyi) ===
- Li Xilie 779-786
- Wu Shaocheng 786-809
- Wu Shaoyang 809-814
- Wu Yuanji 814-817

In 799, Wu Shaocheng of Huaixi (Zhumadian) invaded Tang territory. After several inconclusive battles, Wu halted his aggression and received a pardon from Emperor Dezong of Tang.

Huaixi was the only autonomous province that was surrounded on all sides by loyalists, but they posed a serious problem to the Tang as they were within striking range of the Grand Canal system or the prosperous Yangtze delta, forcing the central government to station large garrisons around the borders of the rebel region. Moreover, the Huaixi armies were formidable, as their infantry excelled in both town defence and in the field, and, more importantly, the autonomous governors undertook efforts to cultivate a large independent supply of horses to build a highly-capable cavalry force.

In 815, the Tang invaded Huaixi with a force 90,000 men. They surrounded the warlord province but failed to make headway against its fortifications for two years. In the winter of 817, the Tang general Li Su penetrated the border defenses during a snowstorm took the undefended capital, ending the war.

== Huang Chao Rebellion (874–884) ==
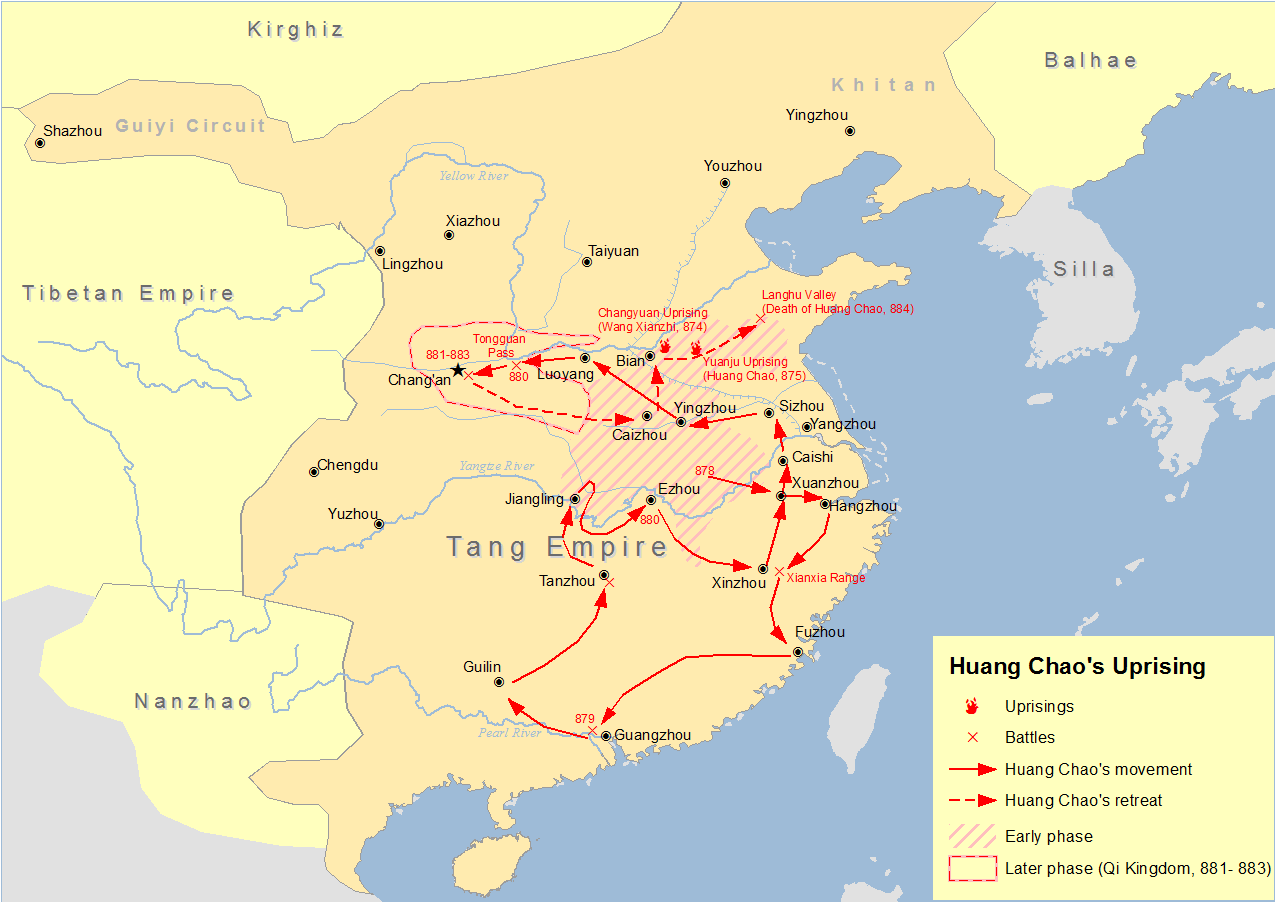
Huang Chao Rebellion, 874–884

In the early 870s, drought and famine in Henan led to widespread banditry. In 874, the bandits rebelled under Wang Xianzhi in Changyuan, and ravaged the region between the Changjiang and Yellow River. When Wang Xianzhi died in 878, he was succeeded by Huang Chao, a failed examination candidate from a wealthy salt trading family.

Huang Chao led his forces south to avoid conflict with government forces and sacked the city of Guangzhou in the summer of 879. His soldiers began succumbing to the southern climate and disease, so he gave in to their demands and returned north again, crossing the Changjiang in the summer of 880, and capturing Luoyang on 22 December. The Tang's most powerful military commanders, Liu Jurong (826-89) and Gao Pian (d. 887) chose not to engage in battle with Huang Chao's army. Huang Chao's army easily routed the old and feeble soldiers of the Shence Army in January 881 and took Chang'an on 8 January. Emperor Xizong of Tang fled to Sichuan. In 883, the Tang court called in the Shatuo Turk Li Keyong, who defeated Huang Chao's army at Liangtian Hill. Huang Chao evacuated Chang'an in May and headed eastward. After an unsuccessful siege operation and several defeats against imperial forces, Huang Chao was finally hunted down in Shandong and killed in the summer of 884.

He [Huang Chao] targeted Guangzhou [Khanfu], among the cities in China, which was the town the Arab merchants headed for. Between Guangzhou and the sea is a journey of many consecutive days, and the city is located in a great valley near fresh water. Its citizens kept him [Huang Chao] at bay, and therefore he besieged them for a long period, this being in the year 264 (AH; 877 CE), until he conquered the city and put its inhabitants to the sword. Those who are experienced with the affairs (of China) related [to me] that in addition to the Chinese he killed one hundred and twenty thousand people – Muslims, Christians, Jews, and Zoroastrians who had sought refuge in the city.

— Abū Zayd al-Sīrāfī

== Miscellaneous rebellions ==
=== Li Jingye (684) ===
In 684, Li Jingye rebelled in Yangzhou and was defeated.

=== Pugu Huai'en (764) ===
In 764, Pugu Huai'en rebelled and joined the Uyghur Khaganate and Tibetan Empire in attacking Chang'an, but Pugu died on the way there.

=== Li Lingyao (777) ===
In 777, Li Lingyao rebelled in Biansong (Kaifeng) and was defeated. The majority of his territory was taken over by Li Zhengji of Pinglu.

=== Jingyuan Incident (781–786) ===
When Li Baochen of Chengde died in 781, Emperor Dezong of Tang refused to recognize his successor, Li Weiyue. In response, Li Weiyue rebelled with the support of Tian Yue of Weibo and Li Na of Pinglu. Zhu Tao of Youzhou sided with the court and dealt several defeats to Li, and as a result Li was overthrown by Wang Wujun. However both Wang and Zhu were disappointed in the rewards they received for their service and rebelled against the Tang in 782. By the end of the ear, the jiedushi of Huaixi, Li Xilie, had also rebelled, cutting off the Bian Canal.

On 23 November 783, troops from Jingzhou passed through Chang'an on their way to the battlefront. When they found out that they had only been paid a fraction of the normal soldier's salary, they rebelled and took the capital. Dezong fled to Fengtian while the Jingzhou troops enthroned Zhu Ci as the new emperor. In 784, Dezong pardoned Wang Wujun, who then turned against Zhu Tao and defeated him on 29 May. With the northeastern front settled, Tang forces recovered Chang'an in the next month. Li Xilie was poisoned by Chen Xianqi in 786 and the area was brought back under nominal Tang authority.

=== Li Huaiguang (784–785) ===
In 784, the Shuofang general Li Huaiguang rebelled. His troops refused to obey his orders and he committed suicide in 785.

=== Qiu Fu (860) ===
In 860, the Qiu Fu Uprising in Zhejiang was suppressed.

=== Pang Xun (868–869) ===
In 868, the garrison of Guizhou rebelled under Pang Xun, a low ranking officer. The garrison troops had been stationed there for six years and were requested by the court to extend their service for one more year. They rebelled and defeated Linghu Tao's troops. They moved north, disrupting the flow of the Grand Canal and taking the provincial capital by the end of the year. They were defeated by Du Shenquan, Kang Chengxun, and crushed in the fall of 869 by Shatuo cavalry commander Zhuye Chixin.

== Collapse (886–907) ==
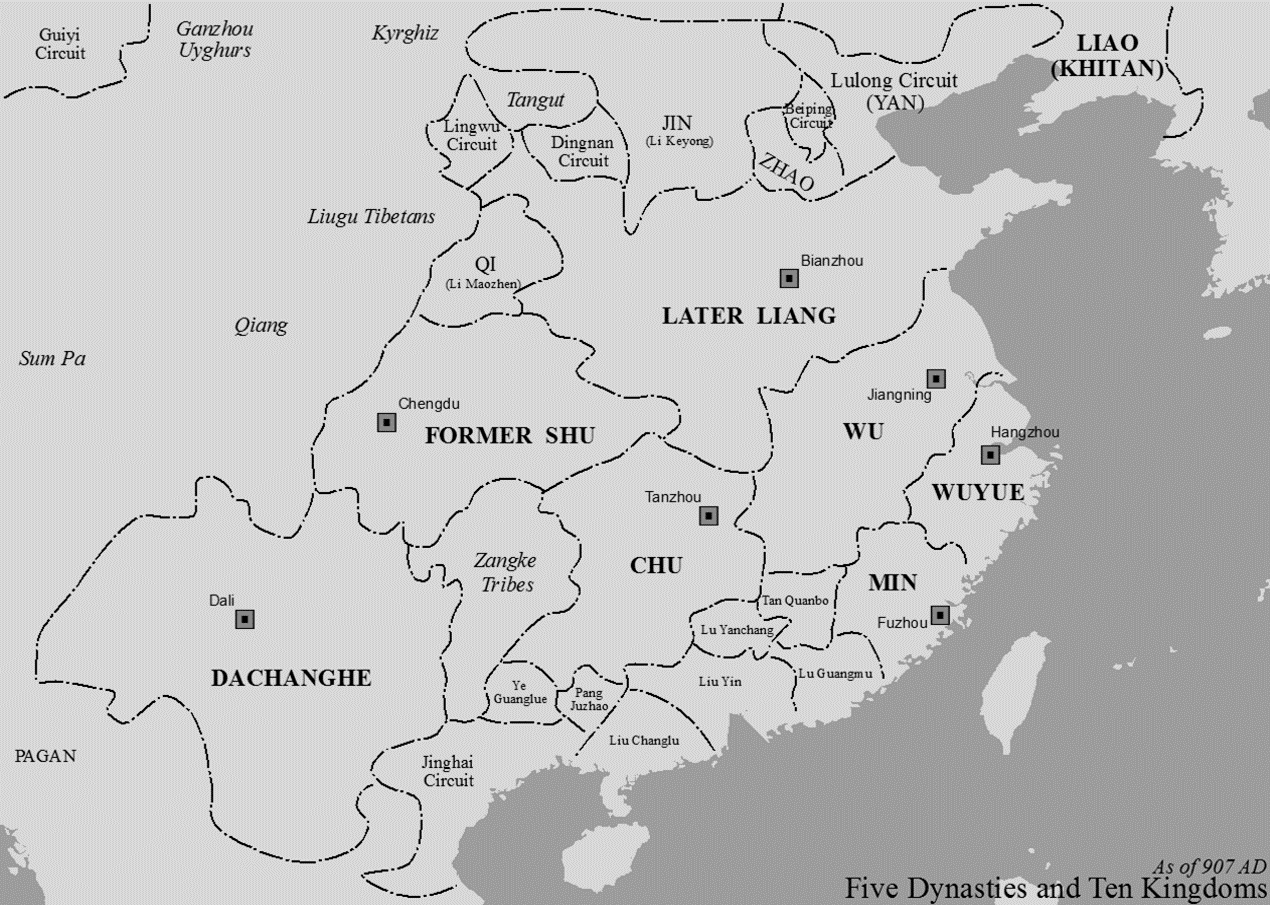
Collapse of the Tang dynasty, 907

While the rebel forces of Huang Chao were defeated in 884, Tang authority had essentially ceased to exist. The newly recruited army of Tian Lingzi, 54,000 strong, was soon destroyed trying to bring two northern warlords to heel. Emperor Xizong and his successors Zhaozong and Ai Di became pawns of the military governors.

The Tang Empire collapsed into numerous rival warlord states, ushering in the period of Five Dynasties and Ten Kingdoms. In the south emerged the kingdoms of Wuyue, Min, and Southern Han. In the north, Li Keyong of Hedong and Zhu Quanzhong of Bianzhou vied for supremacy. Zhu held the last two Tang emperors as captives and controlled the North China Plain. He made an unsuccessful attempt to murder Li in 884 and proclaimed himself Emperor of Later Liang in 907. Zhu's Liang dynasty survived for only 11 years after his death in 912, and it was conquered in 923 by Li Keyong's successor Li Cunxu, founder of Later Tang. In 937, the Later Tang gave way to a number of short lived military regimes from which the Song dynasty eventually emerged, reuniting most of China by 979. However the Song never quite achieved the hegemonic status of the early Tang. It was, militarily speaking, at best only equal and at worst completely inferior to its northern neighbor, the Khitan Liao dynasty, followed by the Jurchen Jin dynasty.

== Bibliography ==
- Andrade, Tonio (2016), The Gunpowder Age: China, Military Innovation, and the Rise of the West in World History, Princeton University Press, ISBN 978-0-691-13597-7.
- Barfield, Thomas (1989), The Perilous Frontier: Nomadic Empires and China, Basil Blackwell
- Beckwith, Christopher I (1987), The Tibetan Empire in Central Asia: A History of the Struggle for Great Power among Tibetans, Turks, Arabs, and Chinese during the Early Middle Ages, Princeton University Press
- Bregel, Yuri (2003), An Historical Atlas of Central Asia, Brill
- Coyet, Frederic (1975), Neglected Formosa: a translation from the Dutch of Frederic Coyett's Verwaerloosde Formosa
- Crespigny, Rafe de (2017), Fire Over Luoyang: A History of the Later Han Dynasty, 23-220 AD, Brill
- Davis, Richard L. (2004), Historical Records of the Five Dynasties
- Drompp, Michael Robert (2005), Tang China And The Collapse Of The Uighur Empire: A Documentary History, Brill
- Ebrey, Patricia Buckley; Walthall, Anne; Palais, James B. (2006). East Asia: A cultural, social, and political history. Boston: Houghton Mifflin. ISBN 9780618133840.
- Golden, Peter B. (1992), An Introduction to the History of the Turkic Peoples: Ethnogenesis and State-Formation in Medieval and Early Modern Eurasia and the Middle East, OTTO HARRASSOWITZ · WIESBADEN
- Graff, David A. (2002), Medieval Chinese Warfare, 300-900, Routledge
- Graff, David A. (2016), The Eurasian Way of War: Military practice in seventh-century China and Byzantium, Routledge
- Herman, John E. (2007), Amid the Clouds and Mist China's Colonization of Guizhou, 1200–1700, Harvard University Asia Center, ISBN 978-0-674-02591-2
- Kitamura, Takai (1999), Zhanlue Zhanshu Bingqi: Zhongguo Zhonggu Pian, Gakken
- Liang, Jieming (2006), Chinese Siege Warfare: Mechanical Artillery & Siege Weapons of Antiquity, Singapore, Republic of Singapore: Leong Kit Meng, ISBN 981-05-5380-3
- Lorge, Peter A. (2011), Chinese Martial Arts: From Antiquity to the Twenty-First Century, Cambridge: Cambridge University Press, ISBN 978-0-521-87881-4
- Lorge, Peter (2015), The Reunification of China: Peace through War under the Song Dynasty, Cambridge University Press
- Mackintosh-Smith, Tim (2014), Two Arabic Travel Books, Library of Arabic Literature
- Needham, Joseph (1994), Science and Civilization in China Volume 5 Part 6, Cambridge University Press
- Nicolle, David (2003), Medieval Siege Weapons (2): Byzantium, the Islamic World & India AD 476-1526, Osprey Publishing
- Park, Hyunhee (2012), Mapping the Chinese and Islamic Worlds
- Peers, C.J. (1990), Ancient Chinese Armies: 1500-200BC, Osprey Publishing
- Peers, C.J. (1992), Medieval Chinese Armies: 1260-1520, Osprey Publishing
- Peers, C.J. (1995), Imperial Chinese Armies (1): 200BC-AD589, Osprey Publishing
- Peers, C.J. (1996), Imperial Chinese Armies (2): 590-1260AD, Osprey Publishing
- Peers, C.J. (2006), Soldiers of the Dragon: Chinese Armies 1500 BC - AD 1840, Osprey Publishing Ltd
- Peers, Chris (2013), Battles of Ancient China, Pen & Sword Military
- Perdue, Peter C. (2005), China Marches West, The Belknap Press of Harvard University Press
- Robinson, K.G. (2004), Science and Civilization in China Volume 7 Part 2: General Conclusions and Reflections, Cambridge University Press
- Romane, Julian (2018), Rise of the Tang Dynasty
- Rong, Xinjiang (2013), Eighteen Lectures on Dunhuang, Brill, doi:10.1163/9789004252332, ISBN 9789004250420
- Skaff, Jonathan Karam (2012), Sui-Tang China and Its Turko-Mongol Neighbors: Culture, Power, and Connections, 580-800 (Oxford Studies in Early Empires), Oxford University Press
- Swope, Kenneth M. (2009), A Dragon's Head and a Serpent's Tail: Ming China and the First Great East Asian War, 1592–1598, University of Oklahoma Press
- Tackett, Nicolas (2014). The Destruction of the Medieval Chinese Aristocracy. Harvard University Press. ISBN 9780674492059.
- Taylor, K.W. (2013), A History of the Vietnamese, Cambridge University Press
- Turnbull, Stephen (2001), Siege Weapons of the Far East (1) AD 612-1300, Osprey Publishing
- Turnbull, Stephen (2002), Siege Weapons of the Far East (2) AD 960-1644, Osprey Publishing
- Twitchett, Denis (1979), The Cambridge History of China 3-1
- Wood, W. W. (1830), Sketches of China
- Wagner, Donald B. (1996), Iron and Steel in Ancient China, E.J. Brill
- Wagner, Donald B. (2008), Science and Civilization in China Volume 5-11: Ferrous Metallurgy, Cambridge University Press
- Wang, Zhenping (2013), Tang China in Multi-Polar Asia: A History of Diplomacy and War, University of Hawaii Press
- Kiernan, Ben (2019). Việt Nam: a history from earliest time to the present. Oxford University Press. ISBN 9780190053796.
- Russell-Smith, Lilla (2005), Uygur Patronage in Dunhuang
- Schafer, Edward Hetzel (1967), The Vermilion Bird: T'ang Images of the South, Los Angeles: University of California Press, ISBN 9780520011458
- Taylor, Keith Weller (1983), The Birth of the Vietnam, University of California Press, ISBN 9780520074170
- Walker, Hugh Dyson (2012), East Asia: A New History, AuthorHouse, ISBN 978-1477265161
- Wright, David (2005), From War to Diplomatic Parity in Eleventh Century China, Brill
- Xiong, Victor (2008), Historical Dictionary of Medieval China, United States of America: Scarecrow Press, Inc., ISBN 978-0810860537
- Xiong, Victor Cunrui (2009), Historical Dictionary of Medieval China, United States of America: Scarecrow Press, Inc., ISBN 978-0810860537
- Xiong, Victor Cunrui (2016), Capital Cities and Urban Form in Pre-modern China: Luoyang, 1038 BCE to 938 CE, Taylor & Francis
- Xu, Elina-Qian (2005), HISTORICAL DEVELOPMENT OF THE PRE-DYNASTIC KHITAN, Institute for Asian and African Studies 7
- Yang, Bin (2008a), "Chapter 3: Military Campaigns against Yunnan: A Cross-Regional Analysis", Between Winds and Clouds: The Making of Yunnan (Second Century BCE to Twentieth Century CE), Columbia University Press
- Late Imperial Chinese Armies: 1520-1840 C.J. Peers, Illustrated by Christa Hook, Osprey Publishing «Men-at-arms», ISBN 1-85532-655-8
