= Youzhou Jiedushi =

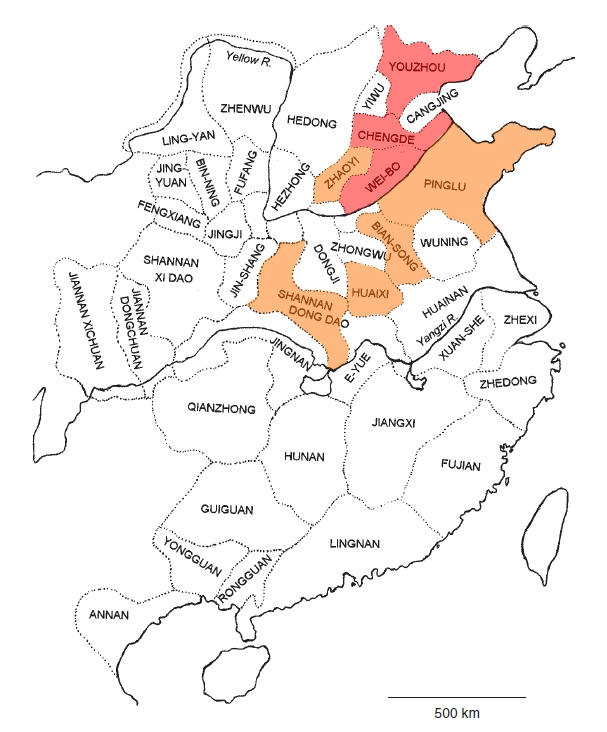
Rebellious provinces in the post-An Lushan Tang dynasty. Red provinces were lost to the Tang forever while the orange provinces were reincorporated.

Yōuzhōu Jiédùshǐ (幽州), also known as Yōujì Jiédùshǐ (幽薊), Yānjì Jiédùshǐ (燕薊), Fànyáng Jiédùshǐ (范陽), and Lúlóng Jiédùshǐ (盧龍), was a military district during the Tang dynasty. It covered the area of Yānjì (燕薊) in what is now the Beijing and Hebei region. Youzhou was the base of operations for An Lushan as well as one of the revolting three garrisons of Hebei.

== History ==
=== Youzhou and Fanyang ===
Tang Xuanzong created the Youzhou Jiedushi from the Sui dynasty's Zhuo Commandery in the year 713 as a buffer against the Kumo Xi and Khitans.

In the year 742 the jiedushi's name was changed to Fanyang Jiedushi.

=== An Lushan ===
An Lushan and Shi Siming used the Fanyang, Hedong, and Pinglu regions as the base of their rebellion and in 756 the Great Yan dynasty was established. The dynasty was extinguished in 763 with the death of Shi Siming's son, Shi Chaoyi, who was the last person to claim the title as Yan's emperor.

=== Lulong Jiedushi ===
After the Anshi Rebellion had ended the military district was renamed Youzhou Jiedushi. However, due to the prominence of the Lulong Army and its association with the place, it came to be known as Lulong Jiedushi.

In 763 Lǐ Huáixiān (李懷仙) presented Shi Chaoyi's head to the Tang and surrendered. Due to the volatile situation in Hebei, the court decided to appease the Yan dynasty's former allies and appointed Li Huaixian as the jiedushi of Youzhou-Lulong with semi-autonomous authority. Li Huaixian was assassinated 768 by his subordinates Zhu Xicai, Zhu Ci, and Zhu Tao.

Zhu Xicai subsequently took over command and solidified his rule over the region after defeating an army sent by Li Baochen, a friend of Li Huaixian's seeking revenge over his death. The Tang court appointed Wang Jin as military governor of Youzhou and sent him there. Xicai showed him respect but made it clear that real power remained in his hands. Wang Jin left after a few days and the Tang acknowledged Xicai as military governor in 768. It was said that Xicai was extravagant and arrogant, mistreating his soldiers. In 772, his secretary Li Huaiyuan killed him. Zhu Ci succeeded Xicai.

In 774, Zhu Ci submitted to Tang authority while his brother, Tao, remained as acting jiedushi of Youzhou. Tao rebelled in 782 and declared himself Prince of Ji, resulting in Ci's removal from his post. Ci also rebelled. They were defeated by 785.

The Zhus were succeeded by Liu Peng, a commander in the Lulong army. He served for only three months before dying of illness. His son Liu Ji succeeded him. Ji originally promised his brother, Yong, that he would succeed him, but then designated his son, Gun, as successor. In 792, Yong submitted to the Tang court and took his troops with him. In 800, another brother rebelled and was given a minor office in the Tang court. In 810, Ji attacked Chengde (Shijiazhuang). During the campaign, Ji was poisoned by one of his sons, Liu Zong, and died. Zong then had Gun caned to death, taking control of Youzhou. Zong aided the Tang in their campaign against Chengde in 816. After killing his father and brother, Zong had difficulty sleeping, often dreaming of his dead family members. He resigned from his post in 821 and became a monk. He died in Dingzhou (Baoding).

After Liu Zong's resignation, Yingzhou and Mozhou (both in Cangzhou), were split off from Youzhou, which was given to the court appointed Zhang Hongjing. Unlike previous military governors, Hongjing was far removed from the common people and his subordinates mistreated the soldiers. He had the caskets of An Lushan and Shi Siming, who were revered in Youzhou, exhumed. The soldiers rebelled and removed Hongjing from power, putting control in Zhu Kerong's hands. In 826, the soldiers mutinied once again, killing Kerong, in favor of his son Zhu Yansi. Yansi lasted less than four months before he was also killed in another mutiny led by the officer Li Zaiyi. Zaiyi participated in a Tang campaign against the Henghai jiedushi Li Tongjie in 827. In 830 he repelled a Kumo Xi invasion. The next year he was forced to flee from Youzhou due to a mutiny led by his officer, Yang Zhicheng. Yang was removed in a mutiny in 834 and replaced by Shi Yuanzhong. He was killed in a disturbance in 841, after which two more men followed in quick succession before Zhang Zhongwu took control with the support of the Tang court.

Zhang Zhongwu defeated a group of Uyghurs fleeing south after the collapse of the Uyghur Khaganate in 840. He also attempted to compel the Shiwei, Khitans, and Kumo Xi to kill the Uyghurs. In 847, Zhongwu defeated the Kumo Xi and forced Enian Qaghan to flee. Zhongwu died the next year and was succeeded by his son Zhang Zhifang. Zhifang immediately alienated his soldiers and was forced to flee to the Tang court. He was replaced by Zhou Lin. Zhifang was given an honorary office and a salary at court, but his violent and cruel disposition caused him to be demoted to census officer in 852. In 880, he led Tang officials to surrender to Huang Chao but then plotted to kill him. This was discovered and he was executed.

Zhou Lin died in 850 and was replaced by Zhang Yunshen. In 869, Yunshen offered military aid to the Tang against Pang Xun but was declined. Yunshen sent a tribute of salt and rice to supply Tang soldiers instead. It was said that throughout his term as military governor, Yunshen was diligent and frugal. In 872, Yunshen suffered a stroke and died. He was succeeded by his son, Zhang Jianhui. Jianhui did not believe he could challenge the authority of one of his father's subordinates, Zhang Gongsu, and fled.

=== Fall of Tang and aftermath ===
In 875, Gongsu was defeated by a Uyghur officer, Li Maoxun of the Abusi clan, who took over the Jiedushi title. Li Maoxun retired a year later and his son, Li Keju, took over. In 878, Keju was called to aid the Tang against the rebellion of Li Keyong in Datong. Keju defeated Li Keyong twice and forced him to flee to the Tatar tribes. Li Keyong returned to Datong in 882 and defeated Keju, but was repelled by Zheng Congdang. In 885, Keju attacked Li Keyong but the campaign ended in disaster. Fearing retaliation for the failure, Keju's officer Li Quanzhong attacked Keju upon his return. Li Keju committed suicide.

Quanzhong was succeeded by his son Li Kuangwei the next year. Kuangwei was overthrown by his brother Li Kuangchou in 893. Li Keyong attacked Youzhou in 894 and forced Li Kuangchou to flee to Yichang (modern Cangzhou). Yichang's governor Lu Yanwei killed Li Kuangchou. Lulong was given to Liu Rengong. Rengong ruled until 907 when he was overthrown by his son Liu Shouguang. Shouguang's short lived state of Yan was conquered by Li Cunxu in 913.

== See also ==
- Youzhou
