= Shandong Weiqiao Pioneering Group =

Chinese textile company

- Type: Private
- Industry: aluminium, textiles, clothing
- Founded: 1998; 28 years ago
- Founders: Zhang Shiping
- Headquarters: Binzhou, China
- Area served: China, Indonesia, Guinea
- Key people: Zhang Bo (CEO)
- Revenue: US$41.9 billion (2021)
- Number of employees: 100,395 (2021)
- Website: weiqiaocy.com

Shandong Weiqiao Pioneering Group
- Traditional Chinese: 山東魏橋創業有限公司
- Simplified Chinese: 山东魏桥创业有限公司
- Literal meaning: Shandong Weiqiao Pioneering Company Limited
Transcriptions
Standard Mandarin
- Hanyu Pinyin: Shāndōng Wèiqiáo chuàngyè yǒuxiàn gōngsī
- IPA: [ʂán.tʊ́ŋ wêɪ.tɕʰjǎʊ]

The Shandong Weiqiao Pioneering Group (Chinese: 山东魏桥创业, shawn-tung way-CH'YOW) is a Chinese private company active in the textiles industry; it is also the parent company of the aluminium company China Hongqiao Group.

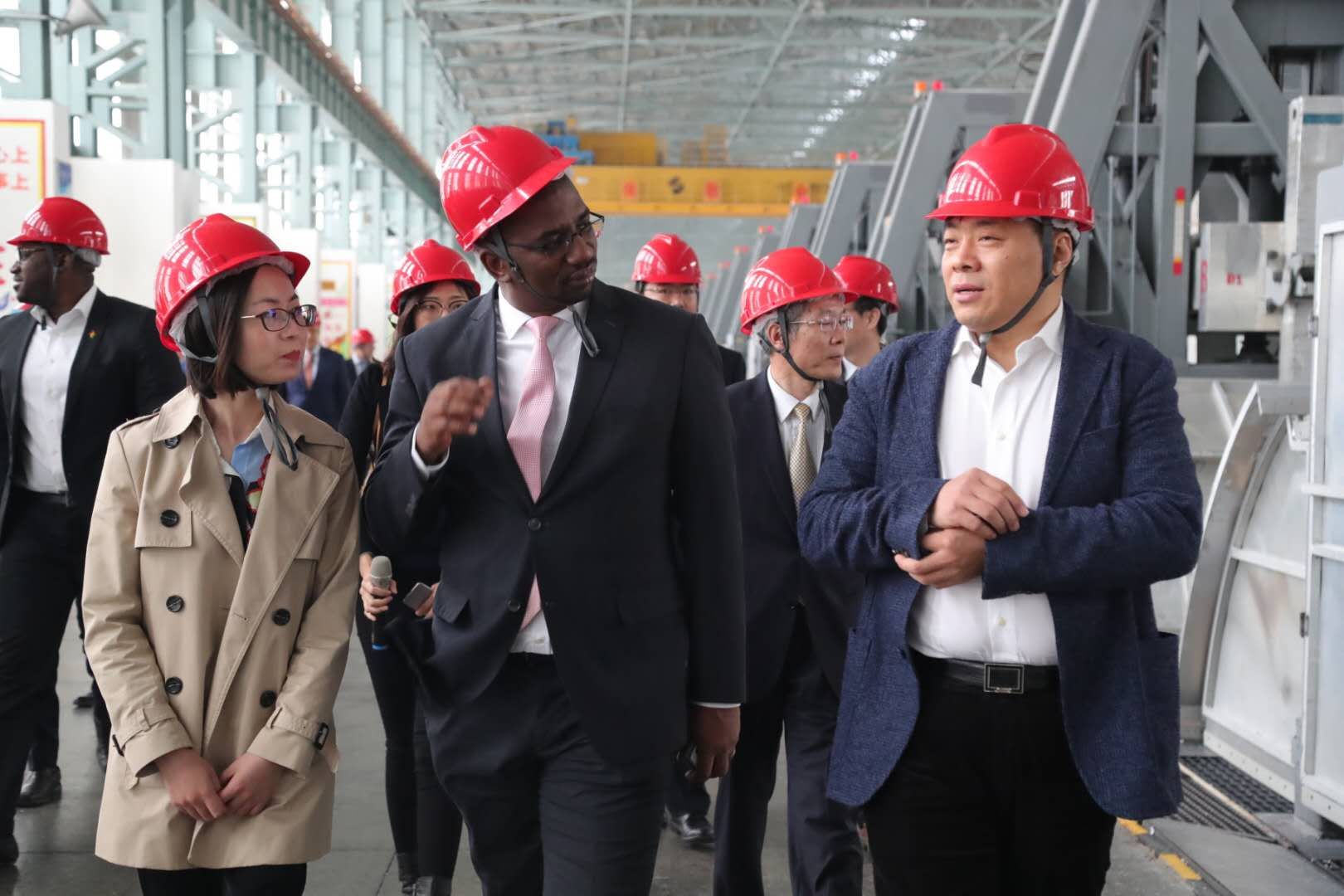
Abdoulaye Magassouba, the Ghanaian Minister of Mines and Geology, visiting a Shandong Weiqiao aluminium refinery.

Originating as a towel manufacturer, Weiqiao produces cotton, denim and synthetic fabrics. Zhang Shiping was the moving force behind the company's expansion from the 1970s onward.

The holding company Shandong Weiqiao was founded in 1998.

It has aluminium operations in Indonesia and Guinea.

In 2021, it was ranked 282nd on the Fortune Global 500.

In April 2023, Shandong Weiqiao Pioneering Group acquired BAW, a Chinese car manufacturer based in Qingdao.

On August 17, 2023, Weiqiao Pioneering Group and ROCK Intelligent signed a strategic cooperation agreement. The agreement includes in-depth cooperation based on the new energy vehicle industry, and will develop lightweight and intelligent new energy vehicles together. After Shandong Weiqiao Pioneering Group took control of BAW's Beijing Automobile Manufacturing Plant, it cooperated with ROCK Intelligent to authorize the use of the Beijing Automobile Manufacturing Factory for the Jishi Automobile brand, a startup of BAW and Jishi 01, the first product of the Jishi brand.
