= Weiqiao =

Weiqiao may refer to the following locations in China:

- Weiqiao, Hebei (魏桥镇), town in Shenzhou City
- Weiqiao, Shandong (魏桥镇), town in Zouping County
- Weiqiao Township, Anhui (渭桥乡), in Xiuning County
- Weiqiao Township, Jiangsu (维桥乡), in Xuyi County

It may also refer to:

- Shandong Weiqiao Pioneering Group (山東魏橋創業), a company
