= Wudi, Shandong =

Wudi 无棣镇
- Town
- Location in Shandong
- Coordinates: 37°44′27″N 117°36′33″E
- Country: China
- Province: Shandong
- Prefecture-level city: Binzhou
- County: Wudi
- Elevation: 9.1 m (30 ft)
- Time zone: UTC+8 (China Standard)

Wudi (simplified Chinese: 无棣; traditional Chinese: 無棣; pinyin: Wúdì) was a town in Wudi County, in the northern Shandong province, which is part of the People's Republic of China. In June 2010, with the approval of the provincial and Binzhou municipal governments, it was dissolved, and together with part of neighbouring Xinyang Township, formed Difeng (棣丰街道) and Haifeng Subdistricts (海丰街道).

== See also ==
- List of township-level divisions of Shandong
