= Li Maoxun =

Chinese name
- Traditional Chinese: 李茂勳
- Simplified Chinese: 李茂勋
Transcriptions
Standard Mandarin
- Hanyu Pinyin: Lǐ Màoxūn
- Wade–Giles: Li Mao-hsün

Li Maoxun (fl. mid-9th century) was a Uyghur warlord active during the late Tang Era of Chinese history, who seized control of Lulong (盧龍) around modern Beijing from 875 to 876 before retiring and turning control of the area over to his son Li Keju.

== Life ==
It is not known when Li Maoxun was born, but it was known that he was a member of the Abusi (阿布思) tribe of the Uyghur Empire. During the period of Zhang Zhongwu's service as the military governor (jiedushi) of Lulong (841–849), Li Maoxun surrendered with other nobles of his tribe during one of Zhang's campaigns against them. He was given a Chinese name with the imperial clan surname of Li. Skillful in horse riding and archery, he was much favored by Zhang and often sent on other border campaigns.

By 875, Lulong was held by Zhang Gongsu, who was not closely related to Zhang Zhongwu. The official histories of the dynasty note that his soldiers despised him for his harshness and violence and hoped that the officer Chen Gongyan (陳貢言), then the commander of the nearby Naxiang Garrison (納降軍), would soon take over. Before that could happen, the ambitious Li Maoxun instead assassinated Chen, took his army, and headed toward the provincial capital Youzhou (Beijing), claiming to be Chen's forward commander against Zhang. Zhang engaged him and was defeated, and Zhang fled to the imperial capital Chang'an. Once Li entered Youzhou, its people realized that he was not acting on Chen's behalf but, given that he had the prefecture under control by this time, they supported him nonetheless. The reigning Emperor Xizong accepted this, commissioning Li first as the acting military governor and then formalizing his position as full military governor.

In the spring of 876, Li Maoxun requested retirement and asked that his son Li Keju be named his replacement. Emperor Xizong agreed, and allowed Li Maoxun to retire while making Li Keju first acting military governor and later full military governor. That was the last historical reference to Li Maoxun. It is not known when he died, although it was presumably long before his son—facing the mutiny by his officer Li Quanzhong—committed suicide along with his entire family in 885.
