= Zhou Lin =

Zhou Lin may refer to:

- Zhou Lin (footballer) (born 1981), Chinese football defender
- Zhou Lin (politician) (1912–1997), Chinese politician
- Zhou Lin (Tang dynasty) (died 850), Chinese general
