= Chewang, Wudi County =

Chewang 车王镇
- Town
- Location in Shandong Chewang (China)
- Coordinates: 37°53′16″N 117°38′25″E
- Country: People's Republic of China
- Province: Shandong
- Prefecture-level city: Binzhou
- County: Wudi
- Elevation: 8.8 m (29 ft)
- Time zone: UTC+8 (China Standard)
- Area code: 0543

Chewang (simplified Chinese: 车王; traditional Chinese: 車王; pinyin: Chēwáng) is a town in Wudi County, in northern Shandong province, China. As of 2011, it has one residential community (社区) and 76 villages under its administration. It is located about 17 km (11 mi) north of the county seat.

== See also ==
- List of township-level divisions of Shandong
