= Di Prefecture =

Historical administrative division in Shandong, China

- Chinese: 棣州
Transcriptions
Standard Mandarin
- Hanyu Pinyin: Dì Zhōu
- Wade–Giles: Ti Chou

Di Prefecture, also known by its Chinese name Di Zhou or Dizhou, was a prefecture (zhou) of imperial China with its seat at Yangxin and Yanci, now part of northwestern Shandong Province, China. It existed intermittently from 586 until 1373.

== History ==
Di Prefecture was established with its seat of government at Yangxin under the Sui in 586. It was reorganized and renamed Cang Prefecture in 606.

The name was restored under the Tang in 621, removed in 623, and restored again in 643 with the prefectural seat moved to Yanci in modern Huimin County. From 742–760, the area was reorganized as Le'an Commandery (樂安郡).

In the 9th century, during the late Tang, Di Prefecture made up part of the territory of the de facto independent Chengde jiedushis. In the early 10th century, during the Five Dynasties and Ten Kingdoms Era, one of them—Wang Rong—ruled the short-lived Kingdom of Zhao.

After 1373, the area was administered as Le'an Prefecture.

== Geography ==
Under the Tang, Di Prefecture covered parts of present-day northern Shandong. It probably included:

- Under the administration of Binzhou:
  - Binzhou
  - Huimin County
  - Yangxin County
- Under the administration of Dongying:
  - Lijin County
- Under the administration of Jinan:
  - Shanghe County

== See also ==
- Bohai Commandery
- Cang Prefecture
- Le'an Prefecture
