= Zhang Shiping =

Chinese entrepreneur (1946–2019)

- 张士平
- Born: 25 November 1946; China
- Died: 23 May 2019 (aged 72)
- Education: Anhui University of Finance and Economics
- Occupations: CEO, China Hongqiao Group
- Known for: Founder, Weiqiao Textile
- Spouse: married
- Children: 3

Zhang Shiping (25 November 1946 – 23 May 2019) was a Chinese entrepreneur. He oversaw the rise of China Hongqiao Group to become the world's biggest aluminum producer and was dubbed China's "Aluminum King". On 23 May 2019, Zhang died of an unspecified illness, according to the official announcement of his hometown, Zouping county in Shandong province.

He was succeeded by his son, Zhang Bo, who has been chief executive of Hongqiao since January 2011 and remains in that role after being elected chairman.

== Career ==
Zhang Shiping founded Weiqiao Textile, the world's largest cotton-textile maker, which is now headed by his daughter Zhang Hongxia.

In 1981, when Zhang was 35, he was promoted to general manager of Zuoping's No. 5 Cotton Ginning plant. In 1994, he and other managers established their own cotton-processing business called Weiqiao Textile Co. It later became the world's largest cotton-yarn and denim maker and was listed in Hong Kong in 2003. Zhang decided to move to the aluminum industry. The move led to an aggressive expansion of the company, and the company was later renamed China Hongqiao Group Ltd. Hongqiao surpassed Russian titan United Co. Rusal and China's SOE Aluminum Corp. of China Ltd. to become the largest producer in the world and was listed in Hong Kong in 2011. According to Forbes estimates, Zhang's net worth is $4.7 billion, ranking 484th in Forbes Billionaires 2019 list.
