= Heliu, Shandong =

Heliu 河流镇
- Town
- Location in Shandong Heliu (China)
- Coordinates: 37°36′39″N 117°38′06″E
- Country: People's Republic of China
- Province: Shandong
- Prefecture-level city: Binzhou
- County: Yangxin
- Elevation: 9 m (30 ft)
- Time zone: UTC+8 (China Standard)
- Area code: 0543

Heliu (Chinese: 河流; pinyin: Héliú) is a town in Yangxin County in northwestern Shandong province, China, located about 6 kilometres (3.7 mi) southeast of the county seat. As of 2011, it has 78 villages under its administration.

== See also ==
- List of township-level divisions of Shandong
