= Madian, Shandong =

Madian 麻店镇
- Town
- Location in Shandong Madian (China)
- Coordinates: 37°25′31″N 117°38′18″E
- Country: People's Republic of China
- Province: Shandong
- Prefecture-level city: Binzhou
- County: Huimin County
- Time zone: UTC+8 (China Standard)

Madian (Chinese: 麻店; pinyin: Mádiàn) is a town under the administration of Huimin County, Shandong, China. As of 2018, it has five villages under its administration.
