= Yangxin railway station (Shandong) =

Railway station in Binzhou, Shandong

Yangxin 阳信

General information
- Location: Yangxin County, Binzhou, Shandong; China
- Coordinates: 37.568612°N 117.612431°E
- Line: Dezhou–Dajiawa railway

History
- Opened: 28 September 2015
Location

Yangxin railway station (Chinese: 阳信站) is a railway station in Yangxin County, China. It is an intermediate stop on the Dezhou–Dajiawa railway.

== History ==
Construction started in November 2013. The station opened on 28 September 2015.
