= SWJ =

SWJ or swj may refer to:

- Small Wars Journal, an online magazine focusing on intrastate conflict
- SWJ, the ASX symbol for Stonewall Resources, an Australian gold mining company
- SWJ, the IATA code for South West Bay Airport, Malakula, Vanuatu
- SWJ, the ICAO code for StatesWest Airlines, a defunct American airline
- swj, the ISO 639-3 code for Shira language, Gabon
