= Northcom Group =

Northcom Group Co., Ltd.
- Trade name: SZSE: 002359
- Type: Public
- Industry: Manufacturing; Wireless broadband
- Founded: 2002; 24 years ago
- Headquarters: Zouping County, Shandong, China
- Area served: Worldwide
- Products: Transmission line towers, Telecom towers, Parking systems, Substation structures and Steel structures
- Owner: Longyue Investment (31.87%); Xinlilong (9.13%); Qixing Group (3.07%)
- Website: www.sdqxtt.com

Northcom Group Co., Ltd.
- Simplified Chinese: 北讯集团股份有限公司
Transcriptions

Northcom Group Co., Ltd. (formerly known as Shandong Qixing Iron Tower Co., Ltd.) is a Chinese company with two main lines of business in the manufacturing towers for power transmission and communications and other industrial products and the provision of wireless broadband services.

== History ==
The company was founded in 2002 as a part of the Qixing Group, a private industrial group based in Shandong with diversified holdings. In February 2010, the company became listed on the Shenzhen Stock Exchange.

=== Financial troubles and sale to Longyue ===
The parent company, Qixing Group, experienced financial difficulties due to overborrowing and rapid expansion in the 2010s. At the peak of its expansion in 2012, the parent company had added capacity to its core business of aluminum production and entered into new lines of business. Years later the president of the China Aluminum Association would say "Qixing expanded blindly".

Throughout 2014, the parent company and its subsidiary Qixing Iron Tower engaged in intracompany lending transactions that were not adequately disclosed according to the listing rules of the Shenzhen Stock Exchange. The Shandong provincial bureau of the China Securities Regulatory Commission launched an investigation into Qixing Iron Tower into the intragroup lending activity. The securities regulator found the company had violated its disclosure obligations and imposed penalties.

Amid the financial troubles, the Qixing Group would sell almost its entire stake in Qixing Iron Tower to Longyue Investment in December 2014. After the sale, Longyue Investment became the controlling shareholder of Qixing Iron Tower was a 31.87% share and Qixing Group only retained a 3.07% share.

=== Stonewall takeover bid ===
The company attempted to move into mining in a takeover bid extending from 2013 to 2014. Qixing Iron Tower made a preliminary offer in May 2013 for Australian-based Stonewall Resources, an Australian Securities Exchange listed miner with assets in Australia and South Africa. After due diligence was completed, the sale of Stonewall Resources was announced in November 2013.

The proposed transaction required necessary approvals in China, South Africa, and Australia, prolonging the duration of the deal process. The parties worked throughout 2014 to obtain the approvals to close the deal. However, the deal was terminated by Qixing Iron Tower in November 2014, 10 days before the deadline for completion.

=== Diversification into wireless broadband ===
After the purchase by Longyue Investment, the company was the vehicle for the 3.55 billion RMB acquisition in 2015 of Beixun Telecom, provider of wireless broadband services. The company raised funds for the acquisition via a private placement worth 6.3 billion RMB with the amount raised going towards the purchase consideration and an expansion of Beixun's wireless broadband data network in nines cities. After the acquisition the company changed its name to Northcom.

== Products and market ==
The company is involved in providing wireless broadband services and manufactures a range of steel products including communications and power transmission towers. Its primary clients in the manufacturing segment are utilities and telecom companies including the two major Chinese utilities China State Grid and China Southern Power Grid, Reliance Group of India and ZTE. The company is the major Chinese exporter of towers.
