= Li Kuangchou =

Li Kuangchou (Chinese: 李匡籌) (died January 25, 895?) was a warlord late in the Chinese Tang dynasty, ruling Lulong Circuit (盧龍, headquartered in modern Beijing) from 893, when he overthrew his older brother Li Kuangwei, to his own defeat in late 894/early 895, as its military governor (jiedushi).

== Background and takeover of Lulong Circuit ==
It is not known when Li Kuangchou was born, but it is known that his family was from Lulong Circuit's capital Fanyang. His father Li Quanzhong had overthrown then-military governor of Lulong, Li Keju, in 885 and taken over as military governor; after Li Quanzhong's death in 886, Li Kuangchou's older brother Li Kuangwei took over the circuit and was then made military governor.

Not much is known about Li Kuangchou's activities during Li Kuangwei's governance, but it is known that he married a Lady Zhang, who was said to be of extremely rare beauty. In 893, as Li Keyong the military governor of Hedong Circuit (河東, headquartered in modern Taiyuan, Shanxi) was attacking Li Kuangwei's ally Wang Rong the military governor of Chengde Circuit (成德, headquartered in modern Shijiazhuang, Hebei), Li Kuangwei prepared to lead his army to aid Wang. At a feast that family members held for him to send him off, Li Kuangwei, while drunk, raped Lady Zhang, causing resentment by Li Kuangchou. As Li Kuangwei's army was returning from Chengde after being successful in forcing Li Keyong's withdrawal, Li Kuangchou took over the circuit headquarters, claimed the title of acting military governor, and issued orders for soldiers to report back to the headquarters. Li Kuangwei's soldiers largely abandoned him and fled to Li Kuangchou, allowing Li Kuangchou to take over without further military action by Li Kuangwei. (Li Kuangwei then remarked that Li Kuangchou lacked talent and, while he was not mourning because the control of the circuit remained in the family, he would be surprised if Li Kuangchou could hold on to the circuit for even two years.)

Subsequently, Wang welcomed Li Kuangwei to Chengde Circuit and, out of gratitude, honored him like a father (as Wang was himself only 19 years old), but Li Kuangwei then tried to seize the circuit from Wang, and was killed by soldiers loyal to Wang. Hearing of Li Kuangwei's death, Li Kuangchou submitted a petition to then-reigning Emperor Zhaozong, requesting permission to attack Chengde to avenge Li Kuangwei; Emperor Zhaozong refused to grant such permission. Meanwhile, the officer Liu Rengong, whose soldiers had long been stationed at Wei Prefecture (蔚州, in modern Zhangjiakou, Hebei) and who had wanted to return to You Prefecture (幽州, i.e., Fanyang), led his soldiers to attack Li Kuangchou. Li Kuangchou's army, however, defeated Liu's at Juyong Pass, and Liu fled to Li Keyong's Hedong Circuit. Later in the year, even without Emperor Zhaozong's authorization, Li Kuangchou attacked Chengde cities Leshou (樂壽, in modern Cangzhou, Hebei) and Wuqiang (武強, in modern Hengshui, Hebei), ostensibly to avenge Li Kuangwei. In spring 894, Emperor Zhaozong officially commissioned him as military governor.

== Defeat and death ==
After Liu Rengong's arrival in Hedong, he was treated kindly by Li Keyong. Liu then, through Li Keyong's chief strategist Gai Yu, submitted a request for Li Keyong to give him 10,000 men so that he could capture Lulong. Li Keyong agreed with the plan, but initially only had a few thousand men to give Liu. The initial attacks therefore failed. This led to Li Kuangchou's misjudging of the situation and believing that he could defeat Hedong forces, so he made frequent incursions into Hedong territory. In anger, Li Keyong himself commanded a major attack against Lulong in winter 894. He quickly captured Wu Prefecture (武州, in modern Zhangjiakou) and put Xin Prefecture (新洲, in modern Zhangjiakou as well) under siege. After a relief force Li Kuangchou sent was defeated by Li Keyong at nearby Duanzhuang (段莊), Xin Prefecture surrendered to Li Keyong. Another army of Li Kuangchou's was then defeated by Li Keyong and his adoptive son Li Cunshen. Li Kuangchou took his family members and fled to Cang Prefecture (滄州, in modern Cangzhou), the capital of neighboring Yichang Circuit (義昌). Yichang's military governor Lu Yanwei, however, was enticed by the wealth and concubines that Li Kuangchou was bringing with him, so he sent an army to ambush Li Kuangchou, killing him and taking the others in his party captive. You Prefecture then surrendered to Li Keyong, who gave control of the circuit to Liu Rengong. (Lady Zhang, who was then nursing an infant, was unable to flee. Liu captured her and gave her to Li Keyong, who took her as a concubine; she later became his favorite.)

== Notes and references ==
- Old Book of Tang, vol. 180.
- New Book of Tang, vol. 212.
- Zizhi Tongjian, vol. 259.
