= Huimin County =

Huimin County 惠民县 Hweimin
- County
- Location in Shandong
- Coordinates: 37°29′N 117°31′E
- Country: People's Republic of China
- Province: Shandong
- Prefecture-level city: Binzhou
- Township-level divisions: 3 subdistricts 12 towns
- County seat: Sunwu Subdistrict (孙武街道)

Area
  - Total: 1,363 km^{2} (526 sq mi)
- Elevation: 12 m (39 ft)

Population (2020 census)
  - Total: 569,975
  - Density: 418.2/km^{2} (1,083/sq mi)
- Time zone: UTC+8 (China Standard)
- Postal code: 251700
- Area code: 0543
- Website: huimin.gov.cn

Huimin County
- Traditional Chinese: 惠民縣
- Simplified Chinese: 惠民县
- Postal: Hweimin
- Literal meaning: County of Benefiting the People
Transcriptions
Standard Mandarin
- Hanyu Pinyin: Huìmín Xiàn
- Wade–Giles: Hui-min Hsien

Historical name Yanci County
- Traditional Chinese: 厭次縣
- Simplified Chinese: 厌次县
Transcriptions
Standard Mandarin
- Hanyu Pinyin: Yàncì Xiàn
- Wade–Giles: Yen-tz'u Hsien

Huimin County, also known by its Chinese name as Huimin Xian, is a county under the administration of the prefecture-level city of Binzhou in northwestern Shandong Province, China. Its population was 569,975 in 2020.

== History ==
The area of present-day Huimin County was held by Dongyi tribes during China's Shang dynasty before being organized as the state of Qi by Jiang Ziya shortly after the establishment of the Zhou. Following the collapse of the Qin, a Qi Kingdom was reëstablished in the area during the Chu–Han Contention and early Han before being reorganized first as the Jibei Kingdom and then as Pingyuan Commandery.

By the Eastern Han, the area immediately around Huimin was organized as Yanci County. The county seat became the capital of Di Prefecture when it was rëestablished by the Tang in AD 643. By the late Tang, Di Prefecture made up part of the territory of the de facto independent Chengde jiedushis and, during the Five Dynasties and Ten Kingdoms Era, it formed part of the short-lived Kingdom of Zhao. After 1373, the area was administered as Le'an Prefecture.

== Geography and climate ==
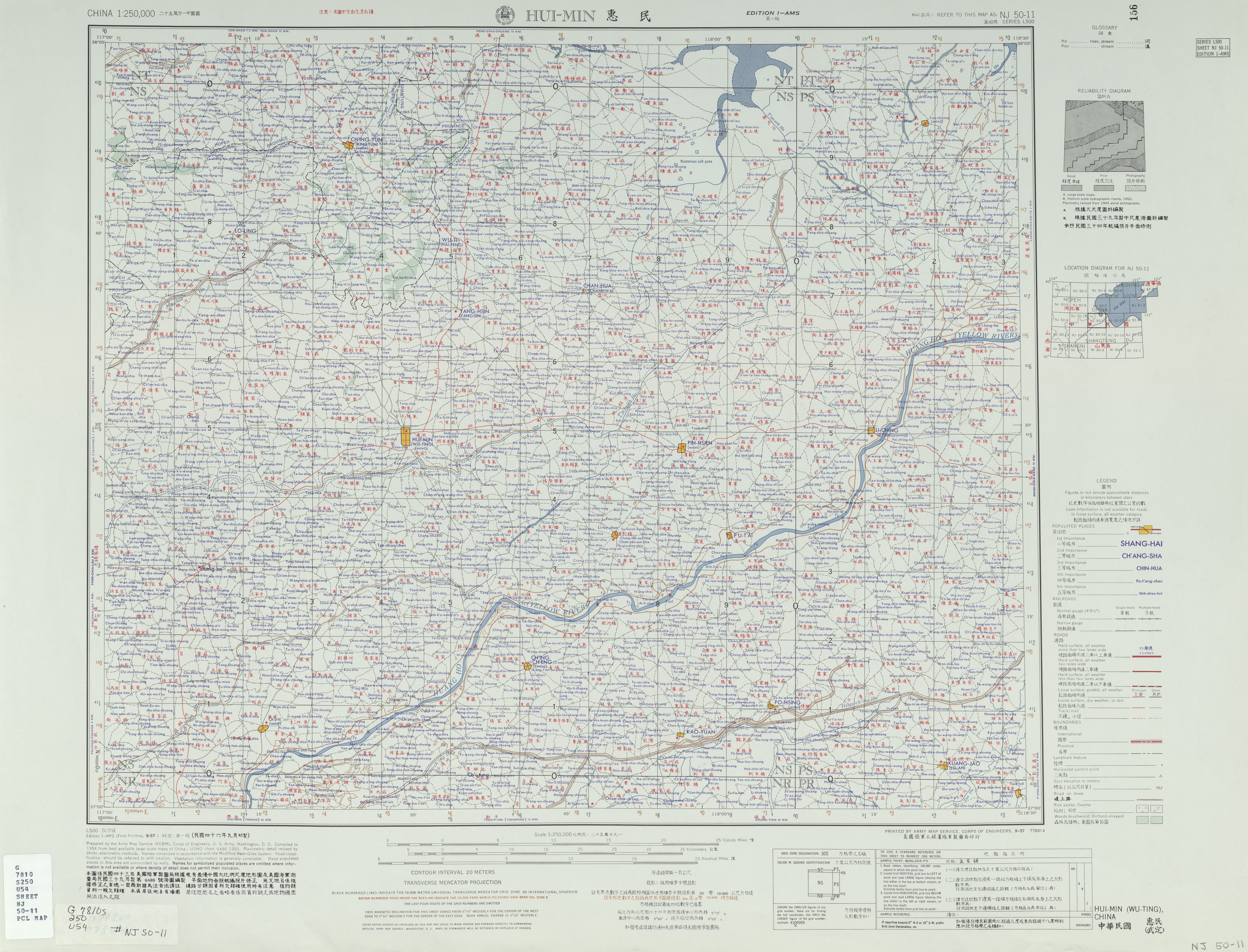
Huimin (labelled as HUI-MIN (WU-TING) 惠民 (武定)) (1954)

Huimin County has a monsoon-influenced, humid continental climate (Köppen Dwa), with hot, humid summers, and cold, very dry winters. The monthly 24-hour average temperatures ranges from −2.9 °C (26.8 °F) in January to 26.7 °C (80.1 °F) in July, and the annual mean is 12.93 °C (55.3 °F). A majority of the annual precipitation occurs in July and August alone. With monthly percent possible sunshine ranging from 47% in July to 63% in October, the county receives 2,563 hours of bright sunshine annually, sunshine is abundant except during the summer months.

Climate data for Huimin County, elevation 12 m (39 ft), (1991–2020 normals, extremes 1981–2010)
Month	Jan	Feb	Mar	Apr	May	Jun	Jul	Aug	Sep	Oct	Nov	Dec	Year
Record high °C (°F)	18.3 (64.9)	23.0 (73.4)	30.4 (86.7)	35.0 (95.0)	39.8 (103.6)	41.7 (107.1)	42.2 (108.0)	38.8 (101.8)	35.4 (95.7)	31.0 (87.8)	26.8 (80.2)	18.2 (64.8)	42.2 (108.0)
Mean daily maximum °C (°F)	3.2 (37.8)	7.1 (44.8)	13.7 (56.7)	20.7 (69.3)	26.5 (79.7)	31.0 (87.8)	31.8 (89.2)	30.3 (86.5)	26.9 (80.4)	20.7 (69.3)	12.1 (53.8)	4.9 (40.8)	19.1 (66.3)
Daily mean °C (°F)	−2.4 (27.7)	1.0 (33.8)	7.5 (45.5)	14.5 (58.1)	20.5 (68.9)	25.2 (77.4)	27.0 (80.6)	25.6 (78.1)	21.0 (69.8)	14.3 (57.7)	6.3 (43.3)	−0.4 (31.3)	13.3 (56.0)
Mean daily minimum °C (°F)	−6.7 (19.9)	−3.6 (25.5)	2.2 (36.0)	8.9 (48.0)	14.8 (58.6)	19.7 (67.5)	22.8 (73.0)	21.7 (71.1)	16.2 (61.2)	9.2 (48.6)	1.6 (34.9)	−4.5 (23.9)	8.5 (47.4)
Record low °C (°F)	−22.4 (−8.3)	−21.4 (−6.5)	−16.6 (2.1)	−4.5 (23.9)	1.2 (34.2)	8.8 (47.8)	12.5 (54.5)	11.0 (51.8)	2.9 (37.2)	−3.6 (25.5)	−12.9 (8.8)	−20.9 (−5.6)	−22.4 (−8.3)
Average precipitation mm (inches)	3.8 (0.15)	9.2 (0.36)	8.1 (0.32)	26.5 (1.04)	44.0 (1.73)	73.8 (2.91)	165.3 (6.51)	141.1 (5.56)	40.0 (1.57)	26.8 (1.06)	17.7 (0.70)	4.3 (0.17)	560.6 (22.08)
Average precipitation days (≥ 0.1 mm)	2.1	2.8	2.7	5.0	5.7	7.5	11.2	9.9	6.1	4.7	4.2	2.5	64.4
Average snowy days	3.0	2.4	1.1	0.2	0	0	0	0	0	0	1.0	2.0	9.7
Average relative humidity (%)	60	57	52	56	60	63	77	81	74	67	66	63	65
Mean monthly sunshine hours	168.7	172.5	222.9	241.0	272.9	236.1	194.3	197.7	206.4	198.9	166.4	164.7	2,442.5
Percentage possible sunshine	55	56	60	61	62	54	44	47	56	58	55	56	55
Source: China Meteorological Administration

== Administrative divisions ==
There are three subdistricts and 12 towns in the county:

Subdistricts:

- Sunwu Subdistrict (孙武街道), Wudingfu Subdistrict (武定府街道), Hefang Subdistrict (何坊街道)

Towns:

- Shimiao (石庙镇), Sangluoshu (桑落墅镇), Zijiao (淄角镇), Huji (胡集镇), Lizhuang (李庄镇), Madian (麻店镇), Weiji (魏集镇), Qinghe (清河镇), Jianglou (姜楼镇), Xindian (辛店镇), Danianchen (大年陈镇), Zaohuli (皂户李镇)
