= Shandong University of Aeronautics =

University in Binzhou, China

- 山东航空学院
- Motto: 明德 砺学 日新 致远
- Type: Public
- Established: 1954
- President: Changhai Li
- Location: Binzhou, Shandong Province, China
- Campus: urban 160 ha
- Website: https://english.bzu.edu.cn/

Shandong University of Aeronautics, previous name as Binzhou University (Chinese: 滨州学院; pinyin: Bīnzhōu xuéyuàn) is a public university located in Binzhou, Shandong province, China. The university was established in 1958.

In 2023, the university renamed Shandong University of Aeronautics.
