= Li Zaiyi =

Li Zaiyi (Chinese: 李載義) (July 18, 788 - June 4, 837), né Li Zaiyi (李再義, note different character of his later name), courtesy name Fanggu (方谷), formally the Prince of Wuwei (武威王), was a general of the Chinese Tang dynasty who, from 826 to 831, ruled Lulong Circuit (盧龍, headquartered in modern Beijing) in de facto independence from the imperial government as the circuit's military governor (Jiedushi), although he was respectful to Emperor Wenzong and participated in the imperial campaign against the rebel general Li Tongjie. After he was expelled in a mutiny by Yang Zhicheng, the imperial government continued to commission him as a military governor, and he served at two other circuits subsequently.

== Background ==
Li Zaiyi was born in 788. He was a descendant of Li Chengqian, who was at one point the crown prince of Emperor Taizong of Tang, and therefore a distant relative to Tang's imperial family. It was said that his ancestors were known for generations for their battlefield prowess and served at You Prefecture (幽州, in modern Beijing, Lulong Circuit's capital). Li Zaiyi lost his father early, and he spent his days touring with those from his home area not under anyone's orders. Li was said to be strong and capable in wrestling. When then-military governor of Lulong, Liu Ji, saw him, Liu was impressed, and invited him to serve on Liu's guard corps. For his subsequent accomplishments, Li received repeated promotions.

In 826, then-military governor Zhu Kerong and his son Zhu Yanling (朱延齡) were killed in a mutiny. Another faction of soldiers initially supported Zhu Kerong's second son Zhu Yansi to succeed him. Zhu Yansi, however, was said to be cruel, and several months later, Li led another mutiny and killed Zhu Yansi, and further slaughtered the Zhu family. He then submitted a report of Zhu Yansi's crimes to the imperial government. Soon thereafter, Emperor Jingzong commissioned Li as the new military governor. Li was also created the Prince of Wuwei and bestowed a new name Zaiyi.

== As the military governor of Lulong ==
In 827, the imperial government prepared for a campaign against Li Tongjie, who seized control of Henghai Circuit (橫海, headquartered in modern Cangzhou, Hebei) after the death of his father, Li Quanlüe (李全略), who had been military governor, without imperial sanction. Li Zaiyi offered to participate in the imperial campaign, and subsequently, when Emperor Wenzong did declare a general campaign against Li Tongjie, Li Zaiyi was one of the generals mobilized. Li Tongjie, trying to get the other circuits' military governors to speak on his behalf, sent many of his relatives to try to bribe those military governors with money, treasures, and women, but when he sent his nephew with bribes to Lulong, Li Zaiyi arrested his nephew and sent the nephew and the bribe to the capital Chang'an. Thereafter, Li Zaiyi participated in attacking Henghai's capital prefecture Cang Prefecture (滄州). After Li Tongjie surrendered in 829, Li Zaiyi received the honorific chancellor title of Tong Zhongshu Menxia Pingzhangshi (同中書門下平章事).

In 830, Xi forces attacked Lulong. Li Zaiyi defeated the Xi forces and captured the chieftain Rujie (茹羯); he subsequently sent Rujie to Chang'an.

In 831, when Li Zaiyi was feasting with an imperial emissary, his officer Yang Zhicheng started a mutiny, and Li Zaiyi and his son Li Zhengyuan (李正元) were forced to flee to Yi Prefecture (易州, in modern Baoding, Hebei) (in neighboring Yiwu Circuit (義武)). Emperor Wenzong initially considered launching an army to reinstate Li Zaiyi, but the chancellor Niu Sengru pointed out that the imperial government had no strength at the time for such a campaign. Emperor Wenzong thus allowed Yang to take over (although, at that time, only naming Yang acting military governor). Meanwhile, when Li Zaiyi arrived in Chang'an from Yi Prefecture, Emperor Wenzong, because Li Zaiyi had been respectful and had participated in the campaign against Henghai, continued to let him carry the title Tong Zhongshu Menxia Pingzhangshi, and further conveyed the title of Taibao (太保, one of the Three Excellencies) on him.

== Subsequent career ==
In summer 831, Emperor Wenzong made Li Zaiyi the military governor of Shannan West Circuit (山南西道, headquartered in modern Hanzhong, Shaanxi), as well as the mayor of its capital Xingyuan Municipality (興元). In 833, he was made the military governor of Hedong Circuit (河東, headquartered in modern Taiyuan, Shanxi), as well as the mayor of its capital Taiyuan Municipality. It was said that at that time, whenever Tang's ally the Uyghur Empire sent emissaries to offer tributes, the emissaries often pillaged the Tang territory they went through. The local governments did not dare to complain, and only reacted by mobilizing security forces. When Li Zaiyi arrived at Hedong, there happened to be a Uyghur mission led by the emissary Li Chang (李暢) going through the area. Li Zaiyi met with Li Chang and stated:

The Khan sent you, General, to submit tributes, in order the affirm the relationship between uncle and nephew. The khan did not send you to trample and humiliate the greater empire. If you, General, do not control your subordinates, such that they assault and rob, I, Li Zaiyi, will kill them. Do not think that you can disregard Chinese laws.

Li Zaiyi then sent away his guards and put only two guards at his headquarters. Li Chang, impressed, did not carry out any hostile actions.

In 834, Yang Zhicheng was himself expelled by his officer Shi Yuanzhong. He fled toward Chang'an, and as he went through Hedong, Li Zaiyi had him battered and wanted to kill him, only stopping after earnest advice from the staffers. Li, however, still killed Yang's wife and followers. Emperor Wenzong did not punish Li, on account of his accomplishments. Li then submitted a petition, accusing Yang of having dug up the tombs of Li's mother and brother to steal the treasures buried with them, and he requested that Yang be executed so that he could take out Yang's heart to sacrifice it to his mother; Emperor Wenzong refused, although subsequently, when Shi sent imperial robes that Yang made to Emperor Wenzong (i.e., as evidence that Yang had imperial pretensions), Emperor Wenzong exiled Yang, and later had him killed in exile. In 835, Li was given the greater honorary chancellor title of Shizhong (侍中). When Li's subordinates suggested to Emperor Wenzong that a monument should be erected to commemorate Li's achievements, Emperor Wenzong agreed, and he commissioned the former chancellor Li Cheng to author the text of the monument. However, at that time, Li Zaiyi did not yet have a courtesy name, which was customary to be used on a monument. Emperor Wenzong thus bestowed the courtesy name of Fanggu on him.

Around the new year 836, during a plot by Emperor Wenzong, the chancellor Li Xun, and the general Zheng Zhu, to slaughter the powerful eunuchs who controlled much of imperial governance (an incident later known as the Ganlu Incident), as part of the plot, Emperor Wenzong recalled Li Zaiyi to Chang'an, while naming the official Wang Fan (王璠), who was an associate of Li Xun's, as the new military governor of Hedong. (This was to enable Wang to have an excuse to mobilize troops at the capital to carry out the plot.) After the plot failed (ending in the deaths of Li Xun, Zheng, and several other chancellors, as well as the other plotters and the virtual house arrest of Emperor Wenzong by the eunuchs), Li Zaiyi was allowed to remain at Hedong. It was said that late in his life, Li Zaiyi was arrogant and cruel. He died in 837 and was given posthumous honors.

== Notes and references ==
- Old Book of Tang, vol. 180.
- New Book of Tang, vol. 212.
- Zizhi Tongjian, vols. 243, 244, 245.
