= Theta Gold Mines =

Sydney, New South Wales based mining company

- Formerly: Stonewall Resources Limited (2012-2018); Meridien Resources Limited (2008-2012)
- Type: Public
- Traded as: ASX: TGM; OTCID Basic: TGMGF; FWB: 3LM
- Industry: Mining
- Founded: 2008
- Headquarters: North Sydney
- Key people: Bill Guy (Executive Chairman)
- Products: Gold
- Website: thetagoldmines.com

Theta Gold Mines Limited (ASX: TGM) is an Australian gold mining company developing the Transvaal Gold Mining Estates (TGME) project in Mpumalanga Province, South Africa. The company holds a 74% interest in its South African operations and maintains a resource base of 6.1 million ounces of gold.

== History ==
=== Early years (2008-2012) ===
The company was founded in 2008 as Meridien Resources Limited. Early on the main focus of the company was the development of the Lucky Draw gold tailings dam in Burraga, New South Wales. The company was listed on the Australian Securities Exchange in 2011 under the symbol MRJ. (The similarly named Meridian Minerals Limited was also listed on the ASX under the symbol MII.)

=== Stonewall Resources era (2012-2018) ===
In 2012, the company expanded by acquiring Stonewall Resources, a South Africa focused miner, and renamed the company after the target.

The company entered into a share sale agreement with a Chinese buyer in November 2013. Shandong Qixing Iron Tower Co., Ltd, a subsidiary of the Qixing Group listed on the Shenzhen Stock Exchange, entered into the Sale Share Agreement with Stonewall for a purchase price of US$141 million for 100% shares of Stonewall Mining, the subsidiary of the company holding the South African assets. However, the deal was terminated by SQIT before completion in November 2014. The Beijing No. 4 Intermediate People's Court enforced an arbitration award in Stonewall's favor in July 2017. SQIT would later be acquired in 2014 by the Longyue Group and was renamed the Northcom Group.

In March 2018, the company appointed Bill Guy as a non-executive director, who was subsequently promoted to Chairman in September 2018. Under new leadership, the company upgraded its gold resource to over 5 million ounces in 2018.

=== Theta Gold Mines rebrand (2018-present) ===
On December 18, 2018, shareholders approved changing the company name from Stonewall Resources Limited to Theta Gold Mines Limited, accompanied by a 10:1 share consolidation and a ticker change from SWJ to TGM.

== Transvaal Gold Mining Estates (TGME) ==
The TGME project is located in Mpumalanga Province, South Africa, spanning 620 square kilometers (62,000 hectares) near the historic gold mining towns of Pilgrims Rest and Sabie. The area contains more than 43 historical mines and has historical production of 6.7 million ounces of gold from colonial-era operations.

The 2022 feasibility study outlined development of four underground mining fronts that could produce 1.08 million ounces of gold over approximately 13 years. The project contains 558,000 ounces in Proven and Probable reserves covering the first seven years of production. The study estimated peak capital requirements of US$77 million with all-in sustaining costs averaging US$834 per ounce. Using a gold price of US$1,642 per ounce, the study projected a post-tax NPV10 of US$219 million and an internal rate of return of 57%.

The company plans to develop a 540,000 tonnes per annum carbon-in-leach processing plant. In February 2024, Theta signed a $30 million construction agreement with Yellow River, a subsidiary of PowerChina, as the preferred EPC contractor for the processing plant. As of July 2025, the company was completing site clearance and preparation works, with full construction targeted for 2026 and transition to producer status planned for early 2027. Future expansion opportunities could enable production from three additional mining centres, potentially increasing processing rates to 960,000 tonnes per annum and gold production up to 160,000 ounces annually.

In October 2022, Theta secured US$70 million (approximately A$110 million) in development funding through a streaming agreement with Sprott Resource Streaming. In June 2025, the Industrial Development Corporation (IDC) of South Africa approved a R622 million (US$35 million) debt facility consisting of a seven-year loan with an 18-month capital and interest moratorium. In July 2025, the company raised an additional US$4 million (A$6.2 million) through a private placement to Hong Kong Ruihua Green Development.
