= Zhongwu =

Zhongwu may refer to:

- Zhang Zhongwu (張仲武, died 849), Tang dynasty general
- Prince Zhongwu of Fenyang (汾陽忠武王, 697–781), Tang dynasty general
- Zhongwu (忠武), the posthumous name of:
  - Zhuge Liang (181–234), chancellor of the state of Shu Han during the Three Kingdoms period
  - Han Shizhong (1089–1151), general of the late Northern Song dynasty and the early Southern Song dynasty
  - Chang Yuchun (1330–1369), early Ming dynasty general
