= Yangxin County, Shandong =

Yangxin County 阳信县 Yangsin
- County
- Location of the seat in Shandong
- Coordinates: 37°38′28″N 117°34′41″E
- Country: People's Republic of China
- Province: Shandong
- Prefecture-level city: Binzhou

Area
  - Total: 798 km^{2} (308 sq mi)
- Elevation: 8.8 m (29 ft)

Population (2019)
  - Total: 471,900
  - Density: 591/km^{2} (1,530/sq mi)
- Time zone: UTC+8 (China Standard)
- Postal code: 251800

Yangxin County, Shandong
- Traditional Chinese: 陽信縣
- Simplified Chinese: 阳信县
- Postal: Yangsin
Transcriptions
Standard Mandarin
- Hanyu Pinyin: Yángxìn Xiàn
- Wade–Giles: Yang-hsin Hsien

Yangxin County is a county under the administration of the prefecture-level city of Binzhou in northwestern Shandong Province, China. It covers 793 km^{2} (306 sq mi) and had 426,117 people in 1999.

== History ==
In the medieval period, Yangxin made up part of Di and Le'an Prefectures. The town of Yangxin was the seat of Di Prefecture under the Sui and early Tang.

== Administrative divisions ==
As of 2012, this county is divided to 6 towns and 3 townships.

Towns

- Yangxin (阳信镇)
- Shangdian (商店镇)
- Wendian (温店镇)
- Heliu (河流镇)
- Zhaiwang (翟王镇)
- Liupowu (流坡坞镇)

Townships

- Sudian Township (劳店乡)
- Shuitapo Township (水落坡乡)
- Yanghu Township (洋湖乡)

== Climate ==
Climate data for Yangxin, elevation 10 m (33 ft), (1991–2020 normals, extremes 1981–present)
Month	Jan	Feb	Mar	Apr	May	Jun	Jul	Aug	Sep	Oct	Nov	Dec	Year
Record high °C (°F)	18.1 (64.6)	21.8 (71.2)	30.3 (86.5)	31.8 (89.2)	37.1 (98.8)	40.2 (104.4)	39.3 (102.7)	37.3 (99.1)	36.3 (97.3)	31.5 (88.7)	26.4 (79.5)	17.1 (62.8)	40.2 (104.4)
Mean daily maximum °C (°F)	3.1 (37.6)	6.9 (44.4)	14.2 (57.6)	20.9 (69.6)	26.8 (80.2)	31.2 (88.2)	31.8 (89.2)	30.3 (86.5)	26.9 (80.4)	20.6 (69.1)	12.0 (53.6)	4.7 (40.5)	19.1 (66.4)
Daily mean °C (°F)	−2.5 (27.5)	1.0 (33.8)	7.8 (46.0)	14.4 (57.9)	20.6 (69.1)	25.3 (77.5)	27.1 (80.8)	25.7 (78.3)	21.1 (70.0)	14.2 (57.6)	6.2 (43.2)	−0.7 (30.7)	13.4 (56.0)
Mean daily minimum °C (°F)	−6.8 (19.8)	−3.5 (25.7)	2.5 (36.5)	8.6 (47.5)	14.6 (58.3)	19.8 (67.6)	22.8 (73.0)	21.8 (71.2)	16.2 (61.2)	8.7 (47.7)	1.3 (34.3)	−4.9 (23.2)	8.4 (47.2)
Record low °C (°F)	−17.8 (0.0)	−15.8 (3.6)	−10.0 (14.0)	−2.0 (28.4)	4.0 (39.2)	9.7 (49.5)	17.0 (62.6)	12.4 (54.3)	4.6 (40.3)	−4.2 (24.4)	−12.9 (8.8)	−20.3 (−4.5)	−20.3 (−4.5)
Average precipitation mm (inches)	4.1 (0.16)	8.0 (0.31)	8.1 (0.32)	30.3 (1.19)	44.3 (1.74)	80.2 (3.16)	151.2 (5.95)	151.2 (5.95)	43.4 (1.71)	29.4 (1.16)	17.8 (0.70)	3.7 (0.15)	571.7 (22.5)
Average precipitation days (≥ 0.1 mm)	2.2	3.0	2.7	5.1	5.9	8.1	11.1	10.5	6.8	5.3	3.7	2.5	66.9
Average snowy days	3.0	2.9	1.0	0.2	0	0	0	0	0	0	0.8	1.9	9.8
Average relative humidity (%)	60	57	51	55	60	62	76	80	74	68	66	62	64
Mean monthly sunshine hours	165.4	169.4	232.1	247.6	279.5	249.6	213.1	214.0	210.2	196.6	169.7	163.5	2,510.7
Percentage possible sunshine	54	55	62	62	63	57	48	51	57	57	56	55	56
Source: China Meteorological Administrationall-time August high

== Transportation ==
The area is served by Yangxin railway station.
