= Zhanhua, Binzhou =

Zhanhua 沾化区 Chanhwa
- District
- Location in Shandong
- Coordinates: 37°42′N 118°08′E
- Country: People's Republic of China
- Province: Shandong
- Prefecture-level city: Binzhou

Area
  - Total: 2,218 km^{2} (856 sq mi)
- Elevation: 6.1 m (20 ft)

Population (2019)
  - Total: 367,000
  - Density: 165/km^{2} (429/sq mi)
- Time zone: UTC+8 (China Standard)
- Postal Code: 256800

Zhanhua (simplified Chinese: 沾化; traditional Chinese: 霑化; pinyin: Zhānhuà) is a district of Binzhou, Shandong province, People's Republic of China. It was a county until 2014.

The population in 1999 was 381,416.

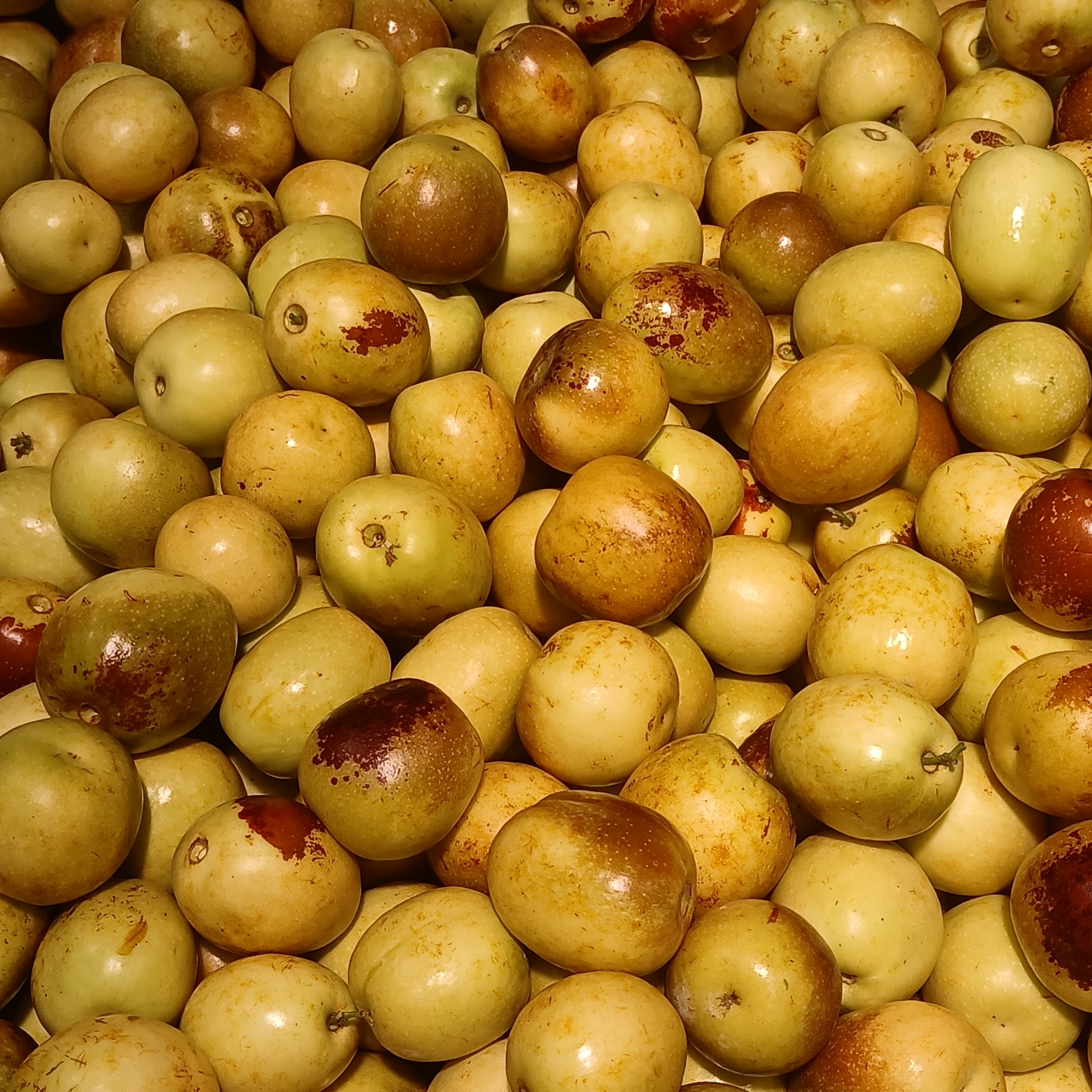
Zhanhua is famous for its Jujube production

== Administrative divisions ==
As of 2012, this district is divided to 2 subdistricts, 5 towns and 5 townships.

Subdistricts

- Fuguo Subdistrict (富国街道)
- Fuyuan Subdistrict (富源街道)

Towns

- Xiawa (下洼镇)
- Gucheng (古城镇)
- Fengjia (冯家镇)
- Botou (泊头镇)
- Dagao (大高镇)

Townships

- Huangsheng Township (黄升乡)
- Binhai Township (滨海乡)
- Xiahe Township (下河乡)
- Liguo Township (利国乡)
- Haifang Township (海防乡)

== Climate ==
Climate data for Zhanhua, elevation 6 m (20 ft), (1991–2020 normals, extremes 1991–present)
Month	Jan	Feb	Mar	Apr	May	Jun	Jul	Aug	Sep	Oct	Nov	Dec	Year
Record high °C (°F)	17.2 (63.0)	23.0 (73.4)	30.4 (86.7)	33.9 (93.0)	38.5 (101.3)	40.9 (105.6)	39.7 (103.5)	38.1 (100.6)	36.2 (97.2)	31.9 (89.4)	25.6 (78.1)	15.7 (60.3)	40.9 (105.6)
Mean daily maximum °C (°F)	2.9 (37.2)	6.5 (43.7)	13.2 (55.8)	20.6 (69.1)	26.5 (79.7)	30.8 (87.4)	31.8 (89.2)	30.3 (86.5)	26.9 (80.4)	20.6 (69.1)	12.0 (53.6)	4.7 (40.5)	18.9 (66.0)
Daily mean °C (°F)	−2.4 (27.7)	0.6 (33.1)	6.8 (44.2)	14.1 (57.4)	20.3 (68.5)	24.9 (76.8)	27.0 (80.6)	25.8 (78.4)	21.3 (70.3)	14.4 (57.9)	6.4 (43.5)	−0.3 (31.5)	13.2 (55.8)
Mean daily minimum °C (°F)	−6.4 (20.5)	−3.7 (25.3)	1.7 (35.1)	8.5 (47.3)	14.6 (58.3)	19.5 (67.1)	22.9 (73.2)	22.1 (71.8)	16.6 (61.9)	9.6 (49.3)	2.0 (35.6)	−4.1 (24.6)	8.6 (47.5)
Record low °C (°F)	−17.8 (0.0)	−12.9 (8.8)	−7.4 (18.7)	−1.9 (28.6)	4.0 (39.2)	10.5 (50.9)	15.5 (59.9)	14.4 (57.9)	7.2 (45.0)	−1.6 (29.1)	−10.6 (12.9)	−14.9 (5.2)	−17.8 (0.0)
Average precipitation mm (inches)	3.9 (0.15)	8.2 (0.32)	7.9 (0.31)	25.9 (1.02)	41.9 (1.65)	77.7 (3.06)	158.6 (6.24)	147.1 (5.79)	35.8 (1.41)	26.3 (1.04)	18.9 (0.74)	4.3 (0.17)	556.5 (21.9)
Average precipitation days (≥ 0.1 mm)	1.8	2.5	2.6	4.6	5.5	8.0	10.5	9.8	5.9	4.8	3.7	2.5	62.2
Average snowy days	3.0	2.6	1.0	0.1	0	0	0	0	0	0	0.7	2.1	9.5
Average relative humidity (%)	61	58	54	55	59	64	77	80	73	67	66	63	65
Mean monthly sunshine hours	169.5	171.8	223.9	240.4	266.9	236.7	202.6	205.8	207.9	199.2	167.4	164.0	2,456.1
Percentage possible sunshine	55	56	60	61	61	54	45	49	57	58	56	55	56
Source: China Meteorological Administrationall-time August high
