= Zhang Gongsu =

Zhang Gongsu (Chinese: 張公素) was a general of the Chinese Tang dynasty, who ruled the Lulong Circuit (盧龍, headquartered in modern Beijing) from 872 to 875 as its military governor (jiedushi) in de facto independence from the imperial government.

== Background ==
It is not known when Zhang Gongsu was born. He was from the Lulong Circuit's capital Fanyang (范陽). As of the middle of Emperor Yizong's Xiantong era (860–874), Zhang Gonsu served as an officer in the Lulong army under the military governor Zhang Yunshen, eventually reaching the position of prefect of Ping Prefecture (平州, in modern Qinhuangdao, Hebei).

Zhang Yunshen died in 872. Emperor Yizong initially commissioned Zhang Yunshen's son Zhang Jianhui as acting military governor. Zhang Gongsu, however, took his army from Ping Prefecture and headed for Lulong's capital prefecture You Prefecture (幽州), to attend Zhang Yunshen's funeral. As the Lulong army soldiers respected Zhang Gongsu, Zhang Jianhui feared that Zhang Gongsu was ready to attack him, and therefore fled to the imperial capital Chang'an. Emperor Yizong then made Zhang Gongsu acting military governor, and later in the year made him full military governor.

== As military governor ==
In 873, when Emperor Yizong died and was succeeded by his son Emperor Xizong, Emperor Xizong bestowed on several military governors, including Zhang Gongsu, the honorific chancellor title Tong Zhongshu Menxia Pingzhangshi (同中書門下平章事).

It was said that Zhang Gongsu was violent and harsh as a military governor, and as his eyes showed much sclera, the people of the circuit referred to him as the "White-Eyed Chancellor." In 875, the ethnically Tujue officer Li Maoxun considered rebelling against him. At the time, the people of the circuit much respected the senior officer Chen Gongyan (陳貢言), who was serving as the commander at Naxiang Base (納降軍, in modern Beijing). Li secretly assassinated Chen and took over his army, and then headed toward You Prefecture, claiming to be Chen's forward commander. Zhang Gongsu engaged him and was defeated, and thereafter fled to Chang'an. (Only after Li then entered You Prefecture did the people realize that he was not Chen, but felt compelled to support him anyway.) Emperor Xizong subsequently demoted Zhang to be the census officer at Fu Prefecture (復州, in modern Hanzhong, Shaanxi). That was the last reference in history to Zhang's career, and it is not known when he died.

== Notes and references ==
- Old Book of Tang, vol. 180.
- New Book of Tang, vol. 212.
- Zizhi Tongjian, vol. 252.
