= Li Quanzhong =

Warlord

Li Quanzhong (Chinese: 李全忠) (d. 886) was a warlord late in the Chinese Tang dynasty, who controlled Lulong Circuit (盧龍, headquartered in modern Beijing) from 885, when he overthrew the prior military governor (jiedushi) Li Keju, to his death in 886. His sons Li Kuangwei and Li Kuangchou successively served as military governors after he died.

== Background ==
It is not known when Li Quanzhong was born, but it is known that he was from Lulong Circuit's capital Fanyang (范陽). During Emperor Xizong's Guangming era (880–881), he served as the military advisor to the prefect of Di Prefecture (棣州, in modern Binzhou, Shandong). After that term, he returned to Lulong and served under the military governor Li Keju.

== Seizure of Lulong ==
In spring 885, Li Keju and his ally Wang Rong the military governor of Chengde Circuit (成德, headquartered in modern Shijiazhuang, Hebei), were apprehensive that Wang Chucun the military governor of Yiwu Circuit (義武, headquartered in modern Baoding, Hebei), was allied with the powerful warlord Li Keyong the military governor of Hedong Circuit (河東, headquartered in modern Taiyuan, Shanxi), as they feared that Li Keyong would eventually have designs on their territory. They therefore entered into a pact to jointly attack Yiwu (which lay between Lulong and Chengde), conquer it, and divide its territory.

To that end, Li Keju had Li Quanzhong take 60,000 soldiers and attack Yiwu's Yi Prefecture (易州, in modern Baoding). Li Quanzhong's subordinate Liu Rengong dug a tunnel into Yi Prefecture's city walls, and the Lulong troops were able to use the tunnel to capture it. However, after the Lulong troops took Yi Prefecture, they became arrogant and did not take precautions against an Yiwu counterattack. Wang Chucun thereafter had his soldiers put on sheepskin at night to appear to be sheep and approached Yi. The Lulong troops thought that there was a large herd for them to pillage, and therefore came out of the city to seize it. They were surprised by the Yiwu soldiers, who attacked and retook Yi. Li Quanzhong, after the defeat, fled back toward You Prefecture (幽州, i.e., Fanyang).

Fearing that Li Keju would punish him for the defeat, Li Quanzhong decided to instead attack You Prefecture. He caught Li Keju by surprise, and Li Keju, despondent over the situation, committed suicide with his family by climbing up a tower and setting fire to it. Li Quanzhong took over the circuit and claimed the title of acting military governor; this act was then confirmed by the imperial government.

== Brief rule ==
In spring 886, Emperor Xizong officially commissioned Li Quanzhong as the military governor of Lulong. Li Quanzhong died in fall 886, and the imperial government then commissioned his son Li Kuangwei as acting military governor, and later full military governor.

== Notes and references ==
- Old Book of Tang, vol. 180.
- New Book of Tang, vol. 212.
- Zizhi Tongjian, vol. 256.
