= Zhang Jianhui =

Zhang Jianhui (張簡會) was a general of the Chinese Tang dynasty who briefly controlled Lulong Circuit (盧龍, headquartered in modern Beijing) in 872 after the death of his father Zhang Yunshen, who had ruled it as its military governor (jiedushi) in de facto independence from the imperial government.

It is not known when Zhang Jianhui was born. It is known that he was one of Zhang Yunshen's 14 sons, of whom only the names of two others, Zhang Jianzhen (張簡真), who predeceased Zhang Yunshen, and Zhang Jianshou (張簡壽), were known in history.

In 872, Zhang Yunshen suffered a stroke, and requested to transfer authorities to Zhang Jianhui so that he could be attended to. Then-reigning Emperor Yizong agreed, and commissioned Zhang Jianhui as the acting military governor. Zhang Yunshen soon died. After Zhang Yunshen's death, one of Zhang Yunshen's subordinates, Zhang Gongsu the prefect of Ping Prefecture (平州, in modern Qinhuangdao, Hebei), brought his forces from Ping Prefecture to attend Zhang Yunshen's funeral. As the soldiers of Lulong's capital prefecture You Prefecture (幽州) respected Zhang Gongsu, Zhang Jianhui was fearful of the situation. He thus fled to the capital Chang'an, where he was made a general of the imperial guards. Most of his brothers became military officers under various regional governors. Nothing else is known about the rest of his career, and it is not known when he died.

== Notes and references ==
- Old Book of Tang, vol. 180.
- New Book of Tang, vol. 212.
- Zizhi Tongjian, vol. 252.
