= Yang Zhicheng (Tang dynasty) =

Yang Zhicheng (Chinese: 楊志誠; died 835?) was a general of the Chinese dynasty Tang dynasty, ruling Lulong Circuit (盧龍, headquartered in modern Beijing) as its military governor (jiedushi) in de facto independence from the imperial government from 831 to 834.

== Early career ==
Virtually nothing is known about Yang Zhicheng's background, including when he was born or where his family was from. It is known that as of 831, Yang Zhicheng served as the deputy commander of the headquarters guards at Lulong Circuit, serving under the military governor Li Zaiyi.

== Seizure of Lulong Circuit ==
On a day in spring 831, when Li Zaiyi was feasting with an imperial messenger, Yang Zhicheng and a group of soldiers he gathered started a disturbance. Li Zaiyi and his son fled to Yi Prefecture (易州, in modern Baoding, Hebei), in neighboring Yiwu Circuit (義武). As part of his takeover, Yang also killed the prefect of Mo Prefecture (莫州, in modern Cangzhou, Hebei), Zhang Qingchu (張慶初). Then-reigning Emperor Wenzong was initially concerned and considered his options, but at the urging of the chancellor Niu Sengru, who pointed out that for decades, Lulong had, in effect, not been under the control of the imperial government, and that Li Zaiyi himself had taken control of the circuit without imperial input. Emperor Wenzong thus allowed Yang to remain in control of the circuit and made him acting military governor (留後, Liuhou). Later in the year, Emperor Wenzong made Yang military governor.

== As military governor ==
As of 833, in addition to being military governor, Yang Zhicheng also carried the honorary title of acting minister of public works (工部尚書, Gongbu Shangshu). In 833, apparently, he demanded greater honor from the imperial government; in response, the imperial government bestowed the honorary title of acting minister of civil service affairs (吏部尚書, Libu Shangshu) on him. His representative at the capital Chang'an, the officer Xu Di (徐迪), arrogantly informed the chancellors, "The soldiers do not understand the system of offices at the imperial government. They only know that it is a promotion to go from being a minister to being Pushe [(僕射, the head of the executive bureau of government (尚書省, Shangshu Sheng)], and they do not know that it is also a promotion to go from the ministry of public works to the ministry of civil service affairs. I fear that when the imperial messenger goes, he will not be able to leave." However, the chancellors took no heed of Xu's threat. Subsequently, when the imperial messengers Wei Baoyi (魏寶義), Jiao Fengluan (焦奉鸞), and Yin Shigong (尹士恭) arrived at Lulong, to announce Yang's new commission, to deliver the spring uniforms to the soldiers, and to conduct an embassy to the Xi and Khitan tribes, Yang detained them. Yang then sent the officer Wang Wenying (王文穎) to Chang'an, formally to thank for the honors and declining them; when the imperial government responded by giving Wang the commission certificate for the minister of civil service affairs, as well as a reply refusing to allow Yang to decline, Wang refused to accept them and left Chang'an without taking them. Eventually, the imperial government placated him later that year by naming him Pushe.

== Defeat and death ==
In winter 834, there was another disturbance in the Lulong army, and Yang Zhicheng was expelled, along with the eunuch monitor Li Huaiwu (李懷仵). The soldiers supported the officer Shi Yuanzhong to take over. As he went through Taiyuan, the capital of Hedong Circuit (河東), Li Zaiyi, who was at that time the military governor of Hedong, had him battered and wanted to kill him, and it was only at the intercession of Li Zaiyi's staff that Yang escaped death, but Li Zaiyi killed Yang's wife and followers. Further, because during Yang's time as military governor, Yang had dug up the graves of Li Zaiyi's mother and brother to take the treasures buried with them, Li Zaiyi made a request to the imperial government to kill Yang and take out his heart to be sacrificed to Li Zaiyi's mother; the imperial government declined the request.

Subsequently, Shi submitted two sets of clothing that Yang had made, that were in designs only appropriate for an emperor, as well as other equipment that only an emperor should use. As a result, Yang was ordered exiled to the Lingnan region. On the way, when he got to Shang Prefecture (商州, in modern Shangluo, Shaanxi), another order was issued for his execution, and he was executed there.

== Notes and references ==
- Old Book of Tang, vol. 180.
- New Book of Tang, vol. 212.
- Zizhi Tongjian, vols. 244, 245.
