= Qixing Group =

Chinese business group whose subsidiaries are engaged in aluminium smelting

Shandong Qixing Group Co., Ltd. is a private Chinese business group whose subsidiaries are engaged in the smelting of aluminum. At one point the company owned an array of other businesses including property development, power cables and ceramics and a five-star hotel before shedding businesses as part of a restructuring plan from heavy debt accumulated during its rapid expansion. It is one of the main industrial groups in Zouping County, one of the richest counties in the country.

== History ==
The company's rapid growth has depended on generous availability of corporate debt. Through heavy borrowing the company was able to expand its aluminum production operations and enter other lines of business. By 2012, Qixing would reach its apex. The group company was then made up of 15 operating companies and seven subsidiaries with revenue 15 billion RMB ($2.3 billion) and had 12,000 employees. These businesses included Qixing Iron Tower, a Shenzhen Stock Exchange listed subsidiary, that manufactured transmission towers. Years later Zeng Libin, the president of the China Aluminum Association, would say "Qixing expanded blindly" during this period of easy credit and expansion.

From its peak, the company would have to sell assets to repay debt as its financial situation deteriorated. The company's interest in Qixing Iron Tower (later renamed Northcom Group) was sold to the Longyue Group in December 2014.

The Qixing Group was at the center of a local financial crisis in Shandong in 2017 based on a web of cross guarantees between the company and other local companies in Zouping County. A total of 10 billion RMB in loans had been advanced to the company and other local companies with the borrowers guaranteeing the debt of the others. In April 2017 the company defaulted on a repayment of seven billion RMB triggering fears of reverberations in the local financial system. However, the repayment was made a few days after the default, restoring calm in the market. As part of a local government orchestrated restructuring plan, the Xiwang Group took over the company and guaranteed its debts in April 2017.

== Aluminum smelting ==
The company's core business it the production of aluminum. It operates a 130,000 metric tons per year aluminum smelter and 500,000 metric tons per year alumina refinery.
