= Zouping =

Zouping 邹平市
- County-level city
- Location in Shandong
- Coordinates: 36°51′47″N 117°44′35″E
- County-level city: People's Republic of China
- Province: Shandong
- Prefecture-level city: Binzhou

Area
  - Total: 1,250 km^{2} (480 sq mi)
- Elevation: 40 m (130 ft)

Population (2020)
  - Total: 774,517
  - Density: 620/km^{2} (1,600/sq mi)
- Time zone: UTC+8 (China Standard)
- Postal Code: 256200
- Website: www.zouping.gov.cn

Zouping (simplified Chinese: 邹平市; traditional Chinese: 鄒平市; pinyin: Zōupíng Shì) is a county-level city of Shandong province, under the administration of Binzhou. The population in 2020 was 774,517.

== Geography ==
The city is located on the northern edge of the mountainous central portion of the province. It is under the administration of the prefecture-level city of Binzhou, but is only 28 kilometres (17 mi) west of downtown Zibo.

== Administrative divisions ==
As of 2012, this city is divided to 3 subdistricts and 13 towns.

Subdistricts

- Daixi Subdistrict (黛溪街道)
- Huangshan Subdistrict (黄山街道)
- Gaoxin Subdistrict (高新街道)

Towns

- Changshan (长山镇)
- Weiqiao (魏桥镇)
- Xidong (西董镇)
- Haosheng (好生镇)
- Linchi (临池镇)
- Jiaoqiao (焦桥镇)
- Handian (韩店镇)
- Sunzhen (孙镇镇)
- Jiuhu (九户镇)
- Qingyang (青阳镇)
- Mingji (明集镇)
- Taizi (台子镇)
- Matou (码头镇)

== Climate ==
Climate data for Zouping, elevation 47 m (154 ft), (1991–2020 normals, extremes 1981–2010)
Month	Jan	Feb	Mar	Apr	May	Jun	Jul	Aug	Sep	Oct	Nov	Dec	Year
Record high °C (°F)	21.0 (69.8)	24.9 (76.8)	32.6 (90.7)	35.2 (95.4)	38.1 (100.6)	43.0 (109.4)	40.6 (105.1)	37.9 (100.2)	37.7 (99.9)	33.8 (92.8)	27.5 (81.5)	23.0 (73.4)	43.0 (109.4)
Mean daily maximum °C (°F)	4.2 (39.6)	8.3 (46.9)	14.9 (58.8)	22.0 (71.6)	27.6 (81.7)	32.0 (89.6)	32.4 (90.3)	30.8 (87.4)	27.6 (81.7)	21.6 (70.9)	13.2 (55.8)	6.0 (42.8)	20.1 (68.1)
Daily mean °C (°F)	−1.3 (29.7)	2.2 (36.0)	8.7 (47.7)	15.9 (60.6)	21.8 (71.2)	26.3 (79.3)	27.7 (81.9)	26.1 (79.0)	21.8 (71.2)	15.3 (59.5)	7.5 (45.5)	0.7 (33.3)	14.4 (57.9)
Mean daily minimum °C (°F)	−5.6 (21.9)	−2.7 (27.1)	3.0 (37.4)	9.7 (49.5)	15.5 (59.9)	20.4 (68.7)	23.2 (73.8)	22.1 (71.8)	16.7 (62.1)	9.9 (49.8)	2.7 (36.9)	−3.4 (25.9)	9.3 (48.7)
Record low °C (°F)	−19.5 (−3.1)	−17.2 (1.0)	−10.2 (13.6)	−3.3 (26.1)	2.3 (36.1)	9.2 (48.6)	14.6 (58.3)	13.0 (55.4)	3.7 (38.7)	−4.9 (23.2)	−15.7 (3.7)	−21.1 (−6.0)	−21.1 (−6.0)
Average precipitation mm (inches)	6.6 (0.26)	11.5 (0.45)	12.0 (0.47)	29.2 (1.15)	64.4 (2.54)	81.3 (3.20)	166.2 (6.54)	164.9 (6.49)	58.7 (2.31)	30.4 (1.20)	27.0 (1.06)	8.1 (0.32)	660.3 (25.99)
Average precipitation days (≥ 0.1 mm)	2.7	3.3	3.6	5.4	6.7	7.8	12.3	11.3	6.9	5.5	4.7	3.5	73.7
Average snowy days	3.4	3.0	1.1	0.2	0	0	0	0	0	0	0.9	2.1	10.7
Average relative humidity (%)	57	53	48	50	55	58	73	78	70	64	63	60	61
Mean monthly sunshine hours	167.5	172.0	222.7	246.6	274.5	246.8	206.9	205.1	203.3	204.4	168.3	166.2	2,484.3
Percentage possible sunshine	54	56	60	62	63	56	47	49	55	59	55	56	56
Source: China Meteorological Administration)

== Economy ==
Zouping is one of the richest counties in the country. Its economic prosperity has depended on the development of the aluminum industry.

The Qixing Group and Hongqiao Group, two large players in the aluminum production industry and pillars of local industry are based in the county.
