= Wudi County =

Wudi County 无棣县 Wuti
- County
- Location of the seat in Shandong
- Coordinates: 37°46′12″N 117°37′34″E
- Country: People's Republic of China
- Province: Shandong
- Prefecture-level city: Binzhou

Area
  - Total: 1,586 km^{2} (612 sq mi)
- Elevation: 6.7 m (22 ft)

Population (2020 census)
  - Total: 465,837
  - Density: 293.7/km^{2} (760.7/sq mi)
- Time zone: UTC+8 (China Standard)
- Postal Code: 251900

Wudi County (simplified Chinese: 无棣县; traditional Chinese: 無棣縣; pinyin: Wúdì Xiàn) is a county in the northwest of Shandong province, People's Republic of China, bordering Hebei province to the northwest and the Bohai Sea to the north. It is the northernmost county-level division of the prefecture-level city of Binzhou.

The population in 2020 was 465,837.

== Administrative divisions ==
As of 2012, this county is divided to 2 subdistricts, 8 towns and 2 townships.

Subdistricts

- Difeng Subdistrict (棣丰街道)
- Haifeng Subdistrict (海丰街道)

Towns

- Shuiwan (水湾镇)
- Jieshishan (碣石山镇)
- Xiaobotou (小泊头镇)
- Chengkou (埕口镇)
- Mashanzi (马山子镇)
- Chewang (车王镇)
- Liubao (柳堡镇)
- Shejia (佘家镇)

Townships

- Xinyang Township (信阳乡)
- Xixiaowang Township (西小王乡)

== Climate ==
Climate data for Wudi, elevation 7 m (23 ft), (1991–2020 normals, extremes 1981–2010)
Month	Jan	Feb	Mar	Apr	May	Jun	Jul	Aug	Sep	Oct	Nov	Dec	Year
Record high °C (°F)	17.7 (63.9)	21.8 (71.2)	30.4 (86.7)	32.5 (90.5)	38.5 (101.3)	41.0 (105.8)	40.7 (105.3)	36.1 (97.0)	35.3 (95.5)	31.5 (88.7)	26.2 (79.2)	17.0 (62.6)	41.0 (105.8)
Mean daily maximum °C (°F)	2.9 (37.2)	6.7 (44.1)	13.5 (56.3)	20.7 (69.3)	26.6 (79.9)	31.1 (88.0)	31.9 (89.4)	30.3 (86.5)	26.9 (80.4)	20.6 (69.1)	11.8 (53.2)	4.6 (40.3)	19.0 (66.1)
Daily mean °C (°F)	−2.5 (27.5)	0.8 (33.4)	7.3 (45.1)	14.4 (57.9)	20.6 (69.1)	25.2 (77.4)	27.2 (81.0)	25.9 (78.6)	21.4 (70.5)	14.6 (58.3)	6.4 (43.5)	−0.4 (31.3)	13.4 (56.1)
Mean daily minimum °C (°F)	−6.6 (20.1)	−3.7 (25.3)	2.1 (35.8)	8.8 (47.8)	14.9 (58.8)	19.8 (67.6)	23.1 (73.6)	22.1 (71.8)	16.8 (62.2)	9.8 (49.6)	2.1 (35.8)	−4.2 (24.4)	8.7 (47.7)
Record low °C (°F)	−22.2 (−8.0)	−16.4 (2.5)	−10.5 (13.1)	−3.2 (26.2)	1.6 (34.9)	10.3 (50.5)	16.0 (60.8)	13.3 (55.9)	4.3 (39.7)	−3.6 (25.5)	−13.6 (7.5)	−19.8 (−3.6)	−22.2 (−8.0)
Average precipitation mm (inches)	3.3 (0.13)	7.6 (0.30)	8.3 (0.33)	26.0 (1.02)	44.0 (1.73)	79.5 (3.13)	175.6 (6.91)	151.8 (5.98)	37.8 (1.49)	28.4 (1.12)	17.8 (0.70)	3.8 (0.15)	583.9 (22.99)
Average precipitation days (≥ 0.1 mm)	1.9	2.4	2.7	5.1	5.4	7.7	11.7	9.8	6.0	4.9	3.6	2.5	63.7
Average snowy days	2.8	2.4	1.0	0.2	0	0	0	0	0	0	0.9	2.0	9.3
Average relative humidity (%)	60	57	52	55	58	62	75	79	71	65	64	62	63
Mean monthly sunshine hours	176.6	173.9	225.8	243.8	274.0	246.5	207.5	208.5	212.8	203.5	170.3	166.4	2,509.6
Percentage possible sunshine	58	57	61	62	62	56	47	50	58	59	57	56	57
Source: China Meteorological Administration
