= Weiqiao, Shandong =

Weiqiao 魏桥镇
- Town
- Location in Shandong Weiqiao (China)
- Coordinates: 37°01′50″N 117°29′30″E
- Country: People's Republic of China
- Province: Shandong
- Prefecture-level city: Binzhou
- County: Zouping
- Elevation: 20 m (66 ft)
- Time zone: UTC+8 (China Standard)
- Area code: 0543

Weiqiao (simplified Chinese: 魏桥; traditional Chinese: 魏橋; pinyin: Wèiqiáo) is a town in Zouping County in northwestern Shandong province, China, located about 29 kilometres (18 mi) northwest of the county seat. As of 2011, it has 82 villages under its administration.

== See also ==
- List of township-level divisions of Shandong
