= Shi Yuanzhong =

Chinese Tang dynasty general (died 841)

Shi Yuanzhong (Chinese: 史元忠; died October 14, 841) was a Chinese general of the Tang dynasty, serving for several years as the military governor (Jiedushi) of Lulong Circuit (盧龍, headquartered in modern Beijing) and ruling it in de facto independence from the imperial government until he was killed in 841.

Virtually nothing is known about Shi Yuanzhong's background, including where he was born or where his family was from. As of 834, he was serving as a battlefield commander (兵馬使, Bingmashi) at Lulong, when the soldiers mutinied and expelled the military governor Yang Zhicheng and the eunuch monitor of the army Li Huaiwu (李懷仵). The soldiers supported Shi to be their leader. Subsequently, after Shi submitted articles of clothing and other equipment that were of design only appropriate for an emperor, which Yang had made, to then-reigning Emperor Wenzong (to show that Yang had inappropriate ambitions), Yang was executed, and Emperor Wenzong made Shi the acting military governor (留後, Liuhou). In 835, Emperor Wenzong made Shi military governor.

Little is known about Shi's governance of Lulong. In 841, there was another disturbance at Lulong, and Shi was killed in the disturbance. The soldiers initially supported the officer Chen Xingtai (陳行泰) to take over the circuit. Then-reigning Emperor Wuzong (Emperor Wenzong's younger brother), under the advice of the chancellor Li Deyu, declined to take immediate action on petitions submitted on Chen's behalf for Chen to become military governor. Soon thereafter, Chen himself was assassinated, and the soldiers supported another officer, Zhang Jiang (張絳) to be their leader. Emperor Wuzong similarly declined to act on petitions on Zhang's behalf. Thereafter, when Lulong officer Zhang Zhongwu, who was then the commander of Xiongwu Base (雄武軍, in modern Chengde, Hebei), requested imperial commission and permission to attack Zhang Jiang, Emperor Wuzong, again under Li Deyu's advice, agreed, and Zhang Zhongwu soon captured Lulong's capital You Prefecture (幽州) and took over the circuit.

== Notes and references ==
- Old Book of Tang, vol. 180.
- New Book of Tang, vol. 212.
- Zizhi Tongjian, vols. 245, 246.
