= Li Keju =

Warlord of the Tang Empire

- Died: 885

Chinese name
- Traditional Chinese: 李可舉
- Simplified Chinese: 李可举
Transcriptions
Standard Mandarin
- Hanyu Pinyin: Lǐ Kějǔ
- Wade–Giles: Li K'o-chü

Li Keju (died 885) was a sinicized Uyghur warlord of the Tang dynasty of China, who served as the military governor (jiedushi) of Lulong (盧龍) around modern-day Beijing from 876 to 885.

== Life ==
=== Early years ===
Li Keju was born during the mid-9th century, although the exact date is uncertain. His father Li Maoxun had been a Uyghur of the Abusi (阿布思) tribe. The tribe had been subdued during the 840s by the Lulong military governor Zhang Zhongwu and members of its nobility—including Li Maoxun—had been obliged to take Chinese names (including the imperial clan's surname Li) and to live in Lulong, working with its military to pacify the northern border of the Tang Empire. In 875, Li Maoxun overthrew the military governor Zhang Gongsu in a mutiny and took control of the region. He was subsequently confirmed by Emperor Xizong as the new military governor. The next year, Li Maoxun requested retirement from the post, recommending his son to succeed him. The emperor allowed the retirement, named Li Keju the acting military governor, and subsequently formally commissioned him as the full military governor later in the year.

=== Li Keyong's rebellion ===
In 878, the sinicized Shatuo officer Li Keyong rebelled and seized Datong and its hinterland. The rebellion was then joined by his father Li Guochang, a Shatuo chieftain who was acting as the Tang military governor of Zhenwu (振武) around modern Hohhot in Inner Mongolia. Li Keju was ordered to mobilize against the rebellion along with Li Jun (李均), military governor of Zhaoyi (昭義) around modern Changzhi, Shanxi; Helian Duo and Bai Yicheng (白義誠), two chieftains of the Tuyuhun; and Mi Haiwan (米海萬), a chieftain of the Sage (薩葛). Preparing for Li Keju's attack, Li Keyong positioned his own force at Xiongwu (雄武軍) around modern Chengde, Hebei, and left his officer Gao Wenji (高文集) at Shuozhou in Shanxi. However, upon the approach of Li Zhuo (李涿), the Tang's new legal military governor for Datong, Gao surrendered the city to him. Li Keyong attempted to return to retake Shuozhou but were intercepted by Li Keju and his officer Han Xuanshao (韓玄紹). Li Keju and Han were able to defeat Li Keyong's men twice, killing 7000 near Shuozhou and then beating them again at Xiongwu. Li Guochang was then defeated by Li Zhuo and Helian and the rebel father and son fled Datong to the Dada (達靼) tribes. For his contributions, Li Keju was given the honorary chancellor title of Shizhong (侍中).

In 882, Li Keyong tried to return to Datong, defeating both Helian—who had been made the military governor of Datong by that point—and Li Keju. Li Keyong was, however, subsequently repelled by Zheng Congdang, the military governor of Hedong (河東) around modern Taiyuan, Shanxi, and was forced to return north.

=== Death ===
By 884, Li Keyong had again become a Tang subject, redeeming himself by making major contributions in the Tang's defeat of the agrarian rebel Huang Chao, establishing himself as the de facto independent military governor of Hedong and several areas along its borders, and protecting himself with an alliance with Wang Chucun, the military governor of Yiwu around modern Baoding, Hebei. Both Li Keju and Wang Rong, the military governor of Chengde (成德) around modern Shijiazhuang, Hebei, were fearful of Li Keyong's growing strength and therefore made a pact to conquer Yiwu and divide its territory between them. They also persuaded Helian to attack Li Keyong, keeping him occupied during their invasion.

They launched their attack in the spring of 885, with Li Keju's officer Li Quanzhong attacking Yiwu's Yi Prefecture with 60,000 men and Wang Rong attacking Wuji (無極) within modern Shijiazhuang. Li Quanzhong's subordinate Liu Rengong was able to capture Yizhou, the capital of Yi Prefecture, by digging a tunnel past its walls. However, despite Helian's attack, Li Keyong was able to come to Yiwu's aid, repelling Wang Rong's attacks on Wuji and Xincheng (新城), also within modern Shijuazhuang, forcing him to withdraw back to Chengde. Lulong's occupation of Yizhou, meanwhile, ended when its men opened the city gates to raid a large flock of nearby sheep, only to find they were 3000 armed men Wang Chucun had covered with sheepskins.

Li Quanzhong was able to escape the city's fall but, believing that Li Keju would punish him severely, he attacked Lulong's capital Youzhou (modern Beijing) with his remaining men. Li Keju's garrison and guards could not resist the attack, so he took his family onto a tower and burned it—and his substantial library of rare works—as a murder-suicide. Li Quanzhong then took over Lulong as its acting military governor.
