= Zhang Yunshen =

- Traditional Chinese: 張允伸
- Simplified Chinese: 张允伸
Transcriptions
Standard Mandarin
- Hanyu Pinyin: Zhāng Yǔnshēn
- Wade–Giles: Chang Yün-shên

Courtesy name Zhang Fengchang
- Traditional Chinese: 張逢昌
- Simplified Chinese: 张逢昌
Transcriptions
Standard Mandarin
- Hanyu Pinyin: Zhāng Féngchāng
- Wade–Giles: Chang Fêng-ch'ang

Title Duke Zhonglie of Yan
- Chinese: 燕忠烈公
Transcriptions
Standard Mandarin
- Hanyu Pinyin: Yàn Zhōngliègōng
- Wade–Giles: Yen Chung-lieh-kung

Zhang Yunshen (785 – 8 March 872), courtesy name Fengchang, formally Duke Zhonglie of Yan, was a general of the Chinese Tang dynasty who ruled Lulong Circuit (盧龍), headquartered in modern Beijing in de facto independence from the imperial government.

== Background ==
Zhang Yunshen was born in 785 during the reign of Emperor Dezong. He was from Fanyang, and his male-line ancestors, including his great-grandfather Zhang Xiu (張秀), grandfather Zhang Yan (張巖), and father Zhang Chaoye (張朝掖), all served as officers in the Lulong army. Zhang Yunshen himself also served as an officer in the Lulong army. In 850, when the military governor Zhou Lin died, the soldiers supported Zhang Yunshen to succeed Zhou, and then-reigning Emperor Xuānzong (a great-grandson of Emperor Dezong's) approved, first making Zhang acting military governor, and then full military governor later in the year.

== As military governor ==
In 859, shortly after Emperor Xuānzong died and was succeeded by his son Emperor Yizong, Emperor Yizong bestowed on Zhang Yunshen the honorific chancellor title of Tong Zhongshu Menxia Pingzhangshi (同中書門下平章事). In 868, he was created the Duke of Yan. In 869, when the imperial government was facing a major rebellion led by Pang Xun at Xu Prefecture (徐州, in modern Xuzhou, Jiangsu), Zhang offered to have his brother Zhang Yungao (張允皐) command an army to assist the imperial operations. When Emperor Yizong declined the assistance, Zhang Yunshen submitted a tribute of rice and salt to supply the troops, and Emperor Yizong issued an edict praising him for doing so. In 870, Emperor Yizong further bestowed the greater honorific chancellor title of Palace Attendant on Zhang.

In 872, Zhang suffered a stroke, and he submitted a petition to yield his responsibilities so that he could attend to his medical condition. Emperor Yizong agreed and made his son Zhang Jianhui the acting military governor. Soon thereafter, Zhang Yunshen died. It was said that in his 22-year-term as military governor, Zhang was diligent and frugal, and the circuit was peaceful and did not lack anything. Most of his 14 sons later served in various Tang military offices as well.
