= Zhou Lin (Tang dynasty) =

Chinese General (died 850)

Zhou Lin (Chinese: 周綝; died 850) was a Chinese military general of the Chinese Tang dynasty, who briefly ruled the de facto independent Lulong Circuit (盧龍, headquartered in modern Beijing) as its military governor (jiedushi).

Little is known about Zhou's life—as while the official histories of Tang, the Old Book of Tang and the New Book of Tang, had biographies for most of the Lulong military governors, both lacked one for Zhou. What is known is that in 849, with the soldiers discontented with and plotting a mutiny against the military governor Zhang Zhifang, who had succeeded Zhang's father Zhang Zhongwu earlier in the year after Zhang Zhongwu's death, Zhang Zhifang took his family and fled to the imperial capital Chang'an. The soldiers supported Zhou to acting military governor, succeeding Zhang Zhifang. Apparently, Zhou was subsequently commissioned military governor by then-reigning Emperor Xuānzong, as, when Zhou died in 850, he was referred to as military governor. The soldiers supported Zhang Yunshen to be his successor, and Emperor Xuānzong subsequently made Zhang Yunshen military governor.
