= China Hongqiao Group =

Chinese aluminium producer

China Hongqiao Group Limited
- Native name: 中国宏桥集团有限公司
- Formerly: Shandong Hongqiao
- Type: Public
- Traded as: SEHK: 1378
- Industry: Aluminium
- Founded: 1994
- Founder: Zhang Shiping
- Headquarters: Hong Kong (registered); Binzhou, Shandong (principal operations)
- Key people: Zhang Bo (chairman and chief executive)
- Revenue: 86,145,130,000 renminbi (2020)
- Operating income: 19,355,200,000 renminbi (2020)
- Net income: 10,496,100,000 Malaysian ringgit (2020)
- Total assets: 181,532,700,000 renminbi (2020)
- Number of employees: 42,445 (2020)
- Parent: Shandong Weiqiao Pioneering Group
- Website: en.hongqiaochina.com

China Hongqiao Group Limited (Chinese: 中国宏桥集团有限公司) is one of the world's largest producers of primary aluminium. Headquartered in Binzhou, Shandong Province, and registered in Hong Kong, the company rose from a textile background in the 1990s to surpass five million tonnes of smelting capacity within fifteen years. It is listed on the Hong Kong Stock Exchange and incorporated in the Cayman Islands. Since 2015 Hongqiao's output has generally ranked second globally, behind only Chalco.

== History ==
Shandong entrepreneur Zhang Shiping founded Shandong Hongqiao in 1994 as a denim manufacturer. Aluminium operations began in 2001, driven by low-cost on-shore credit and self-built coal-fired power. Annual capacity reached about 300,000 t by 2007. In March 2011 the group raised US$2.2 billion through a Hong Kong initial public offering, after which licensed capacity exceeded one million tonnes. Expansion accelerated, and by 2016 the company could smelt more than five million tonnes a year. Zhang Shiping died in 2019; control passed to his son Zhang Bo.

== Operations ==
The heart of Hongqiao's industrial complex lies in Binzhou, where smelters, an alumina refinery and captive coal-power plants are integrated on one site. Seeking to cut emissions and power costs, the group has been relocating up to two million tonnes of smelting capacity to hydropower-rich Yunnan Province, beginning production there in 2020 and targeting more than thirty per cent renewable electricity in its overall mix.

Hongqiao also holds overseas raw-material assets. In Indonesia it is the majority shareholder of PT Well Harvest Winning Alumina Refinery in West Kalimantan, designed for two million tonnes of alumina a year. In Guinea the company participates in the SMB–Winning Consortium, which mines and exports bauxite to Chinese refineries.

== Sustainability ==
Aluminium smelting is energy-intensive; Hongqiao's traditional reliance on coal drew scrutiny from Chinese regulators. In response the company has closed smaller power units, increased purchases of hydro and solar power, and announced a target of net-zero greenhouse-gas emissions before 2055, with carbon peaking planned before 2025. Hongqiao joined the Aluminium Stewardship Initiative in 2021 and gained ASI Performance Standard certification for several downstream plants in 2022. The group has also formed a joint venture with Germany's Scholz Recycling to process end-of-life vehicles and secondary aluminium.

== Controversies ==
Rapid expansion has repeatedly brought Hongqiao into conflict with regulators. In 2017 officials ordered the closure of two million tonnes of unapproved smelting lines as part of a nationwide campaign against illegal capacity. Local environmental bureaus have cited the company for starting construction without timely impact assessments, and the South China Morning Post reported temporary shutdowns in 2016 linked to emission breaches.

In the financial sphere, anonymous short-seller reports in 2017 alleged inflated profit margins and excessive debt. Trading in Hongqiao's shares was twice suspended while auditors reviewed the accounts, and Standard & Poor's later highlighted governance risks in a credit-rating downgrade, though the stock resumed trading in October of that year.
