= Li You (general) =

Li You (李祐) (died June 22, 829), courtesy name Qingzhi (慶之), was a general of the Chinese Tang dynasty. He started his career serving under the warlord Wu Yuanji but, after his capture by the imperial general Li Su in Li Su's campaign against Wu, became instrumental in Li Su's victory over Wu. He subsequently served the imperial government until his death immediately following his campaign against the warlord Li Tongjie.

== Background and service under Wu Yuanji ==
Little is known about Li You's background, including when he was born or where his family was from. It is known that he came to serve as an officer under Wu Yuanji, who controlled Zhangyi Circuit (彰義, headquartered in modern Zhumadian, Henan), and fought in Wu's campaign of resistance against the imperial government after the imperial government refused to sanction Wu Yuanji's takeover of the circuit after the death of his father Wu Shaoyang in 814. It was said that Li You was fierce in battle, and that the imperial forces feared him. He was also said to have inflicted many casualties on the imperial forces during the campaign.

== Participation in Wu Yuanji's defeat ==
By 817, one of the imperially-controlled circuits that was near Zhangyi and which thus continuously battled Zhangyi forces in the campaign, Tangsuideng Circuit (唐隨鄧, headquartered in modern Zhumadian as well), had seen two military governors (jiedushi)—Gao Xiayu (高霞寓) and Yuan Zi—defeated by Zhangyi forces in rapid succession; in response, then-reigning Emperor Xianzong commissioned the less-known general Li Su as Tangsuideng's military governor. One of Li Su's tactics, while battling Zhangyi forces, was to capture Zhangyi officers that he considered capable, endearing them, and retaining them on his staff so that he could learn intelligence about Zhangyi. After he first captured Ding Shiliang (丁士良), Ding suggested that if he targeted and captured Chen Guangqia (陳光洽), the strategist for the key Zhangyi officer Wu Xiulin (吳秀琳), Wu would surrender—and after Ding captured Chen, Wu indeed surrendered. Li Su endeared himself to Wu and asked for Wu's input on how to capture Zhangyi's capital Cai Prefecture (蔡州). Wu responded, "If you, Lord, want to capture Cai Prefecture, you need Li You. I, Wu Xiulin, am not sufficiently capable."

Li Su thereafter targeted Li You and, after setting a trap for Li You with 300 cavalry soldiers while engaging him, Li Su's officer Shi Yongcheng (史用誠) was in fact able to capture Li You. Li Su's soldiers, resentful at how many casualties Li You had inflicted on them, demanded that Li You be put to death, but Li Su resisted the call and treated Li You with respect, causing Li You to be touched. It was said that when discussing tactics about how to capture Cai Prefecture, Li Su would discuss only with Li You and a fellow Zhangyi captive officer, Li Zhongyi (李忠義). The other officers feared that Li You would, at least meetings turn against Li Su and assassinate him, but Li Su did not heed their warnings. Thereafter, there were reports to Emperor Xianzong by those jealous of Li You that Li You must have been plotting still with the Zhangyi rebels, and there were renewed calls for Li You's execution. Li Su, after holding Li You and weeping, publicly declared that he would send Li You to Emperor Xianzong for Emperor Xianzong to execute him—but sent a secret petition to Emperor Xianzong, stating that if Li You were executed, the campaign would fail. Emperor Xianzong, after reviewing the petition, released Li You and returned him to Li Su. Li Su subsequently made Li You his guard commander

Li You thereafter informed Li Su that Zhangyi's elite forces were all stationed at Huiqu (洄曲, in modern Luohe, Henan), under the command of the officer Dong Chongzhi (董重質), and that Cai Prefecture itself was defended by old or weakened soldiers. He suggested that a surprise attack be made on Cai Prefecture itself to capture it, before the Huiqu forces would have any chance to react. After receiving approval from the chancellor Pei Du, whom Emperor Xianzong had put in charge overseeing the operations against Zhangyi, Li Su launched his surprise attack in winter 817. With Li You and Li Zhongyi serving as his forward commanders, he quickly reached Cai Prefecture during a winter storm, and with little resistance captured the city, seizing Wu Yuanji. The remaining Zhangyi forces under Dong surrendered, and the campaign was over. For his contributions during the campaign, Li You was made a general of the imperial guards.

== Between the campaigns against Wu Yuanji and against Li Tongjie ==
Li You was subsequently made the military governor of Xiasui Circuit (夏綏, headquartered in modern Yulin, Shaanxi) as well as the prefect of its capital Xia Prefecture (夏州). In 824, by which time Emperor Xianzong's grandson Emperor Jingzong was emperor, Li You was recalled to the capital Chang'an to serve as a general of the imperial guards. When he got to Chang'an, he made a tribute of 150 horses to Emperor Jingzong. The imperial censor Wen Zao (溫造) submitted an accusation that the tribute was improper and requested that Li You be arrested. Emperor Jingzong ordered that no actions be taken against Li You, but Li You still commented to his friends, "My heart was not at all shaken when I entered Cai Prefecture at midnight to capture Wu Yuanji, but now my gall falls before Censor Wen." Thereafter, because there was a Tufan incursion, Li You was sent to the front to serve as the military governor of Jingyuan Circuit (涇原, headquartered in modern Pingliang, Gansu).

== Campaign against Li Tongjie ==
As of 828, by which time Emperor Jingzong's younger brother Emperor Wenzong was emperor, the imperial forces were locked into a campaign against Li Tongjie, who had seized control of Henghai Circuit (橫海, headquartered in modern Cangzhou, Hebei) after the death of his father Li Quanlüe (李全略), the previous military governor. During the campaign, the imperial government had named a number of generals as military governors for Henghai, but each of whom either died during the campaign or was removed for other reasons. In winter 828, after the last of those, Fu Liangbi (傅良弼), died on the way to the Henghai front, Li You was named the military governor of Henghai and sent to the front.

In spring 829, when 3,000 Yicheng Circuit (義成, headquartered in modern Anyang, Henan) soldiers, who were fighting Henghai forces, suddenly mutinied and deserted, Li You intercepted them and slaughtered them. He subsequently defeated Li Tongjie in a battle and then attacked one of Henghai's prefectures, De Prefecture (德州, in modern Dezhou, Shandong). He quickly captured De Prefecture, and with Henghai's capital Cang Prefecture (滄州) under attack by a general under imperial orders, Li Zaiyi the military governor of Lulong Circuit (盧龍, headquartered in modern Beijing), the De Prefecture soldiers fled to Zhen Prefecture (鎮州, in modern Shijiazhuang, Hebei), the headquarters of Li Tongjie's ally Wang Tingcou the military governor of Chengde Circuit (成德).

Li Tongjie, knowing that his defeat was at hand, sent messengers to Li You, offering to surrender. Li You agreed and submitted Li Tongjie's offer to surrender to the imperial government, while sending his officer Wan Hong (萬洪) to Cang Prefecture to take control of the city from Li Tongjie. The imperial officer Bo Qi (柏耆) was sent to Cang Prefecture to comfort the region, but Bo, fearing that Li Tongjie was trying to trick imperial forces, led several hundred cavalry soldiers himself into Cang Prefecture. He found an excuse to kill Wan, and then had Li Tongjie and his families arrested and bound, to be delivered to Chang'an. On the way of delivering Li Tongjie to Chang'an, he heard rumors that Wang was intending to try to rescue Li Tongjie, so he beheaded Li Tongjie and delivered just the head to Chang'an.

By this point, Li You was ill, and when he heard the news of Wan's death, he was so shocked that his conditions fell worse. Meanwhile, various generals also submitted accusations against Bo, for having killed Wan for no reason and for appearing to want to take the credits of defeating Li Tongjie for himself. Emperor Wenzong commented, "If Li You dies, it is Bo Qi who kills him!" When Li You did die on June 22, Emperor Wenzong ordered Bo to commit suicide.

== Notes and references ==
- Old Book of Tang, vol. 161.
- New Book of Tang, vol. 214.
- Zizhi Tongjian, vols. 240, 243, 244.
