= Han Hong (general) =

Chinese general and Chancellor

Han Hong (Chinese: 韓弘; 765 – January 19, 823), posthumous name Duke Yin of Xu (許隱公), was a general of the Tang dynasty of China, who also served as a chancellor during the reigns of Emperor Xianzong and Emperor Xianzong's son Emperor Muzong.

== Background ==
Han Hong was born in 765, during the reign of Emperor Daizong. His family was originally from Yingchuan (潁川, in modern Xuchang, Henan), but had for generations lived at Hua Prefecture (滑州, in modern Anyang, Henan). Neither his grandfather Han Wang (韓望) nor his father Han Chui (韓垂) was prominent, and he lost his father early in his life. He relied on his mother's clan, particularly his maternal uncle, the general Liu Xuanzuo (劉玄佐), serving on Liu's staff. When Liu, who was then the military governor (Jiedushi) of Xuanwu Circuit (宣武, headquartered in modern Kaifeng, Henan), died in 792, the soldiers supported Liu's son Liu Shining (劉士寧) as his successor initially, and, despite some reluctance, Emperor Daizong's son Emperor Dezong agreed. In 793, after the soldiers mutinied and expelled Liu Shining, Han left Xuanwu's capital Bian Prefecture (汴州) and became an officer at another prefecture of Xuanwu's, Song Prefecture (宋州, in modern Shangqiu, Henan).

== As military governor of Xuanwu Circuit ==
In 799, Liu Shining's successor Liu Quanliang (劉全諒) died, and the Xuanwu soldiers, remembering Liu Xuanzuo, supported Han Hong as the acting military governor. It was said that Han was good at judging which soldiers were brave and which soldiers were not, and assigning the right soldiers for the right tasks. Emperor Dezong subsequently made Han military governor. Meanwhile, Wu Shaocheng the military governor of Zhangyi Circuit (彰義, headquartered in modern Zhumadian, Henan) had recently rose against the imperial government and had reached a secret agreement with Liu Quanliang to jointly attack Chenxu Circuit (陳許, headquartered in modern Xuchang, Henan) and divide it among them. Han repudiated the agreement and sent troops to help the imperial forces' attacks against Wu.

In 800, Han, after he became familiar with the officers, came to understand that one of them, Liu E (劉鍔), had long been involved with the repeated mutinies against military governors. He gathered Liu E and 300 of Liu E's followers and executed them. It was said that after this incident, until Han left the circuit two decades later, the Xuanwu soldiers did not dare to create disturbances again.

In 805, after Emperor Dezong died and was succeeded by his son Emperor Shunzong, but before the news of Emperor Dezong's death had reached the circuits, Li Yuansu (李元素) the military governor of Yicheng Circuit (義成, headquartered in modern Anyang, Henan), had found out about Emperor Dezong's death. As he wanted to let the warlord Li Shigu the military governor of Pinglu Circuit (平盧, headquartered in modern Tai'an, Shandong), not felt left out, he secretly informed Li Shigu — but Li Shigu, wanting to use this opportunity to enlarge his territory, battered Li Yuansu's messenger and accused Li Yuansu of falsely proclaiming the emperor's death. He prepared troops to attack Yicheng, and Li Yuansu sought immediate aid from Han. Han sent messengers to warn Li Shigu, and Li Shigu, apprehensive that Han might attack his back, did not attack Yicheng. Han further intercepted the messengers of Li Shigu and Wu Shaocheng's successor Wu Shaoyang as the messengers went through Xuanwu, and he confiscated the gifts that Li Shigu and Wu were sending each other — salt from Li Shigu to Wu and cowhide from Wu to Li Shigu, pointing out that imperial regulations forbid military governors from sending each other gifts. In 808, by which time Emperor Shunzong's son Emperor Xianzong was emperor, Han received the honorary chancellor title of Tong Zhongshu Menxia Pingzhangshi (同中書門下平章事).

In 812, after another warlord, Tian Ji'an the military governor of Weibo Circuit (魏博, headquartered in modern Handan, Hebei), died, his relative Tian Xing seized control of Weibo from Tian Ji'an's son Tian Huaijian and submitted the circuit to imperial orders. When Li Shigu's brother and successor Li Shidao threatened to attack Tian Xing along with Wang Chengzong the military governor of Chengde Circuit (成德, headquartered in modern Shijiazhuang, Hebei) and threatened Han with this, Han threatened to attack Pinglu's Cao Prefecture (曹州, in modern Heze, Shandong) if Li Shidao attacked Weibo. Li Shidao became apprehensive and did not act against Weibo.

By this point, Han had become arrogant due to the strong army that he had. As he had never gone to the capital Chang'an to pay homage to the emperor, it was said that the imperial government did not treat him as a military governor that it could command easily. After Wang E (王鍔) the military governor of Hedong Circuit (河東, headquartered in modern Taiyuan, Shanxi) also received honorary chancellor title in 814, Han felt disgraced to be sharing the same rank as Wang and wrote the chancellor Wu Yuanheng to complain. As a result, in 815, Emperor Xianzong conferred on Han the honorary title of acting Situ (司徒, one of the Three Excellencies) to make Han's title greater than Wang's. (Chancellors were of the third rank, while the Three Excellencies were of the first rank.)

By that point, imperial forces were locked in a campaign against Wu Shaoyang's son and successor Wu Yuanji, who had resisted the imperial government after failing to receive imperial sanction to succeed Wu Shaoyang after Wu Shaoyang's death in 814. Initially, Yan Shou (嚴綬) the military governor of Shannan East Circuit (山南東道, headquartered in modern Xiangfan, Hubei) was made the overall commander of the forces against Zhangyi, but after the chancellor Pei Du pointed out that Yan was incompetent, late in 815, Emperor Xianzong replaced Yan with Han. However, it was said that Han wanted to hold onto power personally, and therefore did not really want to see Wu Yuanji's quick destruction. To endear himself to one of the key imperial generals against Zhangyi, Li Guangyan the military governor of Zhongwu Circuit (忠武, i.e. the new name for Chenxu), he found a beautiful woman and gave her to Li Guangyan as a gift, but Li Guangyan, pointing out that all of the soldiers were also away from their families, thanked Han but declined the woman, sending her back to Han.

The imperial forces continued to be unable to defeat Zhangyi conclusively, and in fall 817, Pei went to the front to oversee the troops himself — but Han remained titularly the overall commander. Later that year, after a surprise attack by Li Su the military governor of Tangsuideng Circuit (唐隨鄧, headquartered in modern Zhumadian) captured Zhangyi's capital Cai Prefecture (蔡州) and took Wu captive, it was to Han and Pei that Emperor Xianzong issued the edict for them to list those with accomplishments during the campaign to be rewarded. For Han's own contributions during the campaign, Emperor Xianzong gave him the additional honorary chancellor title of Shizhong (侍中). He was also created the Duke of Xu.

It was said that after Wu's destruction, Han became more fearful of the imperial government, and after Emperor Xianzong declared a campaign against Li Shidao in summer 818, Han personally commanded troops against Li Shidao and put Cao Prefecture under siege, even though he was suffering from an illness at the time. In spring 819, Han captured Pinglu's Kaocheng (考城, in modern Shangqiu, Henan). With the imperial generals repeatedly dealing Pinglu forces defeats, Li Shidao's own officer Liu Wu killed Li Shidao and surrendered.

In fall 819, Han made his first trip to Chang'an to pay homage to Emperor Xianzong, and Emperor Xianzong treated him with great respect. He made a large tribute offering of horses, silk, and gold and silver vessels — but despite this, it was said that the Xuanwu treasury continued to be wealthy. He subsequently requested to remain at Chang'an, and Emperor Xianzong kept Han at Chang'an to serve as Zhongshu Ling (中書令), the head of the legislative bureau of government (中書省), considered a post for a chancellor, as well as acting Situ. Han was succeeded by Zhang Hongjing as the military governor of Xuanwu.

== Subsequent career ==
At the suggestion of his son Han Gongwu (韓公武), Han Hong maintained the good will of the other imperial officials and generals by sending them many gifts. (One imperial official who refused these gifts was Niu Sengru, who later received renown for declining Han's gifts.) When Emperor Xianzong died in 820 and was succeeded by his son Emperor Muzong, Han served as regent for three days before Emperor Muzong formally took the throne. Later in the year, he was made the military governor of Hezhong Circuit (河中, headquartered in modern Yuncheng, Shanxi) as well as its capital Hezhong Municipality. At that time, Han Hong's brother Han Chong (韓充) served as the military governor of Yicheng, and Han Gongwu served as the military governor of Fufang Circuit (鄜坊, headquartered in modern Yan'an, Shaanxi), and it was said that no household was more honored than Han's. In 822, Han requested retirement based on old age, and he was recalled to Chang'an to again serve as acting Situ and Zhongshu Ling. He died around the new year 823 and was given posthumous honors.

== Notes and references ==
- Old Book of Tang, vol. 156.
- New Book of Tang, vol. 158.
- Zizhi Tongjian, vols. 235, 236, 237, 239, 240, 241.
