= Li Guangyan =

Li Guangyan (Chinese: 李光顏) (761–826), courtesy name Guangyuan (光遠), né Ädiz Guangyan (阿跌光顏), was a Chinese military general and politician of Tiele ethnicity who served under the Tang dynasty. He was known for his participation in various campaigns against regional warlords during the reigns of Emperor Xianzong and Emperor Muzong.

== Background ==
Ädiz Guangyan was born in 761, during the reign of Emperor Suzong. He had at least one older brother, Ädiz Guangjin (阿跌光進), and one older sister, who was older than Ädiz Guangjin. Their father Ädiz Liangchen (阿跌良臣) had been a hereditary prefect of Jitian Prefecture (雞田州) — one of the prefectures that Tang established for the settlement of Uyghur-related tribes that submitted to Tang during the reign of Emperor Taizong in the Hequ (河曲, i.e., the Ordos Desert region). — and his Ädiz tribal army was part of the army of Shuofang Circuit (朔方, headquartered in modern Yinchuan, Ningxia).

Ädiz Guangyan's older sister married an army officer named Sheli Gezhan (舍利葛旃). In 764, when the military governor (Jiedushi) of Shuofang, Pugu Huai'en, was in rebellion against Emperor Suzong's son Emperor Daizong, Sheli participated in the killing of Pugu's son Pugu Yang (僕固瑒) and subsequently submitted to the imperial general Xin Yunjing (辛雲京), the military governor of Hedong Circuit (河東, headquartered in modern Taiyuan, Shanxi). As the Ädiz brothers were dependent on their brother-in-law, they also settled their household at Hedong's capital Taiyuan. Both Ädiz Guangjin and Ädiz Guangyan learned riding and archery skills from Sheli. It was said that while Ädiz Guangjin was brave and resolute, his fighting abilities and strategies were not as good as Sheli's, but that Sheli was particularly complimentary of Ädiz Guangyan, whose abilities he considered superior to his own.

By this point, Ädiz Guangjin was already known for his battlefield accomplishment while serving under Guo Ziyi, and by 765 was already created a prince. In 769, when the Ädiz brothers' mother died, it was said that there were 44 commemorative banners sent by generals and chancellors to mourn her and that she was buried in an extravagant ceremony.

It was said that the Ädiz brothers were known for their love of family members. Ädiz Guangyan had already been married before his mother's death, and his mother entrusted the affairs of the household to Ädiz Guangyan's wife. When his mother died, Ädiz Guangyan, during the three years of mourning observance for her, was said to not return to his bedchambers for those three years — i.e., did not have sexual relations. After the mourning period, Ädiz Guangjin, who had previously not been married, married. Ädiz Guangyan had his wife send the household books to Ädiz Guangjin's wife — to let her take authority over the household, as the wife of the older brother. Ädiz Guangjin had the books returned to Ädiz Guangyan's wife and told Ädiz Guangyan, "Your wife served our mother, and it was our mother who put her in charge of the household. This cannot be changed." The brothers embraced each other and wept.

Ädiz Guangyan participated in the campaign against Li Huaiguang and had accomplishments during the campaign. His then-commander, the military governor Ma Sui, was impressed by his appearance, and gave Ädiz Guangyan his own sword.

== During Emperor Xianzong's reign ==
=== Before the campaign against Wu Yuanji ===
In 806, during the reign of Emperor Dezong's grandson Emperor Xianzong, Yang Huilin (楊惠琳) seized control of Xiasui Circuit (夏綏, headquartered in modern Yulin, Shaanxi), and Emperor Xianzong mobilized the armies of Hedong and Tiande Base (天德軍, in modern Bayan Nur, Inner Mongolia) to attack Yang. Yan Shou (嚴綬) the military governor of Hedong sent Ädiz Guangjin and Ädiz Guangyan to attack Yang. Soon, Yang's subordinate Zhang Chengjin (張承金) killed Yang and surrendered.

In the fall, Ädiz Guangyan was ordered to rendezvous with the army commanded by the general Gao Chongwen in attacking the rebel warlord Liu Pi, who had seized control of Xichuan Circuit (西川, headquartered in modern Chengdu, Sichuan). Ädiz Guangyan was late for the rendezvous by one day, and feared punishment. He thus advanced behind Liu's lines at Lutou Pass (鹿頭關, in modern Deyang, Sichuan) and cut off Lutou Pass's supply route and led to its surrender to Gao. It was said that Ädiz Guangyan became famous due to this battle, and he was later successively made the prefect of Dai (代州, in modern Xinzhou, Shanxi) and Ming Prefecture (洺州, in modern Handan, Hebei).

In 811, Emperor Xianzong bestowed the imperial surname of Li on Ädiz Guangjin, then the military governor of Zhenwu Circuit (振武, headquartered in modern Hohhot, Inner Mongolia) — and therefore, the Ädiz brothers were renamed Li.

=== The campaign against Wu Yuanji ===
In 814, with Emperor Xianzong preparing a campaign against the rebel Zhangyi Circuit (彰義, headquartered in modern Zhumadian, Henan), whose military governor Wu Shaoyang had just died and Wu Shaoyang's son Wu Yuanji had just seized the control of without imperial approval, Li Guangyan was moved from Ming Prefecture to be the prefect of Chen Prefecture (陳州, in modern Zhoukou, Henan), as part of a number of movements of generals in preparation for the campaign. Li Guangyan was also made the commander of the forces of Zhongwu Circuit (忠武, headquartered in modern Xuchang, Henan), to which Chen Prefecture belonged to. Later that year, after Wu Yuanji openly rebelled, Li was made the military governor of Zhongwu, serving under his old commander Yan, who was put in charge of the operations against Zhangyi. Almost alone among the imperial generals against Zhangyi, Li had repeated success against Zhangyi troops, and when Emperor Xianzong sent the official Pei Du to the front to review the troops in 815, Pei's report to Emperor Xianzong singled Li out as brave and righteous in his behavior. However, while often victorious, he was not always so, and he suffered a defeat in fall 815 at Shiqu (時曲, in modern Luohe, Henan).

Meanwhile, Emperor Xianzong, seeing Yan as an ineffective overall commander, put Han Hong the military governor of Xuanwu Circuit (宣武, headquartered in modern Kaifeng, Henan) in overall command of the forces. However, it was said that Han, who liked having authority, did not want Wu to be destroyed too quickly and disliked Li for his fervent campaigning. In order to subvert Li, Han found a beautiful woman who he had trained in singing, dancing, music and the game of Liubo, and dressed in fine clothes and luxurious jewels. He had his messenger deliver the woman to Li as a gift, in the hope that she would distract him from his military activities. When Han's messenger delivered the woman to Li at a grand feast, it was said that all of the guests were astonished by her beauty. However, Li responded to the messenger:

I am greatly grateful that the Lord Chancellor [(i.e., Han, who carried an honorary chancellor title)] had mercy on me, who is alone in this army. However, of the tens of thousands of soldiers here, who did not leave his home and his family, to come a long distance to subject his body to the sword? How can I just entertain myself?

He wept, as did the other guests. He then presented Han's messenger with gifts of his own for Han, and had the messenger deliver his gifts, along with the woman, back to Han, commenting, "Please thank the Lord Chancellor for me, Li Guangyan. I have promised the body to the empire, and I will not bear the sun or the moon together with the bandit [(i.e., Wu)]; I would rather die first."

There was another incident in which Li came in conflict with Han. On an occasion Han ordered a general attack against a Zhangyi city, the Zhangyi forces responded by concentrating a counterattack against Li's colleague Wu Chongyin, the military governor of Heyang Circuit (河陽, headquartered in modern Pingdingshan, Henan), and the attack was so fierce that Wu Chongyin was hit by spears several times. He sought immediate aid from Li, and Li sent his officers Tian Ying (田穎) and Song Chaoyin (宋朝隱) to attack the Zhangyi forces from behind. After Tian and Song were successful, the attack against Wu Chongyin was terminated. However, as Li violated Han's orders in doing so, Han had Tian and Song arrested and was ready to execute them. Li, fearing Han, did not dare to intercede directly, but the imperial eunuch Jing Zhongxin (景忠信) happened to be present, and falsely ordered, in Emperor Xianzong's name, that Tian and Song be spared, before submitting a report to Emperor Xianzong as to what happened. Both Li and Han subsequently submitted conflicting reports, and Emperor Xianzong spared Tian and Song over Han's objections.

Thereafter, Li and Wu Chongyin were repeatedly defeating Zhangyi troops, but there was no decisive victory. In summer 817, when Li attacked the important Zhangyi city of Yancheng (郾城, in modern Luohe), the defender of Yancheng, Deng Huaijin (鄧懷金) offered to surrender to Li — but as Deng's and his soldiers' families were all at Zhangyi's capital prefecture Cai Prefecture (蔡州), Deng requested that he first be allowed to summon a relief army, and that Li then attack the relief army, before Deng would surrender, in hopes that Wu Yuanji would spare Deng's and his soldiers' families. Li agreed, and he subsequently defeated a Zhangyi army sent to relieve Yancheng, and Deng then surrendered. Wu Yuanji, in fear of continued advances by Li, sent his strongest soldiers, under Dong Chongzhi (董重質), to be stationed at Huiqu (洄曲, in modern Luohe), to try to defend against a probable Li attack.

Meanwhile, Emperor Xianzong had commissioned Pei to oversee the operations against Zhangyi, and when Pei arrived at the front, he made Yancheng his headquarters. There was an occasion when Pei was overseeing the construction of the fortress of Tuokou (沱口, in modern Luohe), when Dong launched a surprise attack, almost capturing Pei. The Zhangyi forces were fought off by Li and Tian Bu, however, allowing Pei to escape capture — as it was said that Li foresaw a potential surprise attack by Dong and therefore had stationed Tian nearby. With the Zhangyi forces concentrated on defending against Li Guangyan, Cai Prefecture was left relatively unguarded, and later in the year, Li Su the military governor of Tangsuideng Circuit (唐隨鄧, also headquartered in modern Zhumadian) was able to launch a surprise attack on Cai Prefecture, capturing Wu Yuanji. With Cai Prefecture having fallen and Dong having fled back to Cai Prefecture to surrender to Li Su, Li Guangyan entered Dong's camp and accepted the Zhangyi soldiers' surrender there. For his contributions, Li Guangyan was given the title of acting Sikong (司空, one of the Three Excellencies). In spring 818, Emperor Xianzong had a eunuch hold a feast for him at the eunuch's mansion and gave him a large award of rice. Emperor Xianzong also personally welcomed Li Guangyan and awarded him a golden belt and multicolored banners.

=== After the campaign against Wu Yuanji ===
In summer 818, in preparation for the campaign against another warlord, Li Shidao the military governor of Pinglu Circuit (平盧, headquartered in modern Tai'an, Shandong), Emperor Xianzong moved Li Guangyan to be the military governor of Yicheng Circuit (義成, headquartered in Anyang, Henan). He was permitted to take some Zhongwu troops with him, and he subsequently, as part of the campaign against Li Shidao, defeated Pinglu forces at Puyang (濮陽, in modern Puyang, Henan). However, subsequently, Emperor Xianzong came to believe that Zhongwu and Yicheng forces should not be mixed, and therefore returned Li Guangyan to Zhongwu.

In 819, during a Tufan incursion, Li Guangyan was moved to be the military governor of Binning Circuit (邠寧, headquartered in modern Xianyang, Shaanxi) and permitted to take 6,000 Zhongwu soldiers with him. He was also put in charge of reconstructing Yan Prefecture (鹽州, in modern Yulin). At that time, the chancellor Huangfu Bo, whom Emperor Xianzong trusted, was in charge of the finances, and was not prompt in delivering supplies to the border defense troops. Worse, the supplies that he delivered were said to be so decrepit that the food could not be eaten and the clothes could not be worn; the soldiers were so angry that it was often rumored that mutinies would occur. Li was said to be so distressed that he considered committing suicide, as his petitions to Emperor Xianzong on the subject were not believed.

== During Emperor Muzong's reign ==
In 820, Emperor Xianzong died and was succeeded by his son Emperor Muzong. Later that year, after Li Guangyan went to Chang'an to pay homage to Emperor Muzong, he was given the honorary chancellor title of Tong Zhongshu Menxia Pingzhangshi (同中書門下平章事). Yet later that year, when Tufan forces attacked Jing Prefecture (涇州, in modern Pingliang, Gansu), of his neighboring Jingyuan Circuit (涇原, headquartered at Ping Prefecture), Li sent his forces to try to relieve Jing Prefecture. However, his soldiers were upset at the large rewards that the soldiers of the imperial Shence Army were receiving, requiring Li to personally and tearfully urge them to fight for the state. Eventually, as Li's soldiers were approaching Jing Prefecture, Tufan forces became fearful and withdrew. He was soon made the military governor of Fengxiang Circuit (鳳翔, headquartered in modern Baoji, Shaanxi).

Late in 821, Li was again made the military governor of Zhongwu, in anticipation of his gathering Zhongwu troops in a campaign against Wang Tingcou, who had taken over Chengde Circuit (成德, headquartered in modern Shijiazhuang, Hebei), and Zhu Kerong, who had taken over Lulong Circuit (盧龍, headquartered in modern Beijing), both of whom were resisting imperial authority. He was also made the commander of the imperial forces then at Shen Prefecture (深州, in modern Hengshui, Hebei) — a prefecture belonging to Chengde whose prefect Niu Yuanyi (牛元翼) was holding out against Wang's siege — replacing Du Shuliang (杜叔良).

However, when Li got to the front, it was said that while imperial forces were trying to rescue Niu in three different directions, they all lacked food supplies and were unable to advance, and even an accomplished general like Li had to simply protect his own forces first. In spring 822, with Shen Prefecture in desperate straits, the imperial government capitulated and commissioned Wang the military governor of Chengde, sending the official Han Yu to announce the commission and to persuade Wang to allow Niu to leave. Wang, while accepting the commission, still kept Shen Prefecture under siege for sometime; Niu had to fight his way out of the siege to flee to the imperial camps, and his remaining troops at Shen Prefecture were slaughtered. Meanwhile, to allow Li's forces to be supplied, Emperor Muzong temporarily made him the military governor of Henghai Circuit (橫海, headquartered in modern Cangzhou, Hebei), where his army was stationed at the time, as well. When his soldiers believed that they would be kept at Henghai, however, they rioted, and Li was unable to control them. He became so fearful that he became ill, and he sent a petition to Emperor Muzong declining the Henghai commission. Emperor Muzong agreed, and kept his commission limited to Zhongwu and allowed him to return to Zhongwu's capital Xu Prefecture (許州).

Late in the year, the soldiers of Xuanwu Circuit mutinied against their military governor Li Yuan (李愿, Li Su's brother), and Li Yuan was forced to flee. The soldiers supported an officer, Li Jie (李㝏) as their leader, and Li Jie sought imperial commission as military governor. Emperor Muzong refused, and commissioned Han Hong's brother Han Chong (韓充) as the new military governor, ordering Li Jie to report to Chang'an to serve as a general of the imperial guards. Li Jie refused and openly rose against the imperial government. In addition to Han Chong, Li Guangyan and Cao Hua (曹華) the military governor of Yanhai Circuit (兗海, headquartered in modern Jining, Shandong) also launched their troops against Li Jie. Li Jie was soon killed by his subordinate Li Zhi (李質), who surrendered to Han. For his contributions, Li Guangyan was given the honorary chancellor title of Shizhong (侍中).

== During Emperor Jingzong's and Wenzong's reigns ==
In 824, after Emperor Muzong died and was succeeded by his son Emperor Jingzong, Li Guangyan was made the military governor of Hedong and the mayor of Taiyuan; he was also made Situ (司徒, also one of the Three Excellencies). He died in 826 and was given posthumous honors, along with the posthumous name of Zhong (忠, "faithful"); at his burial, then-reigning Emperor Wenzong (Emperor Jingzong's brother) also bestowed a large award of silk.
