= Pei Du =

Chinese politician and government official

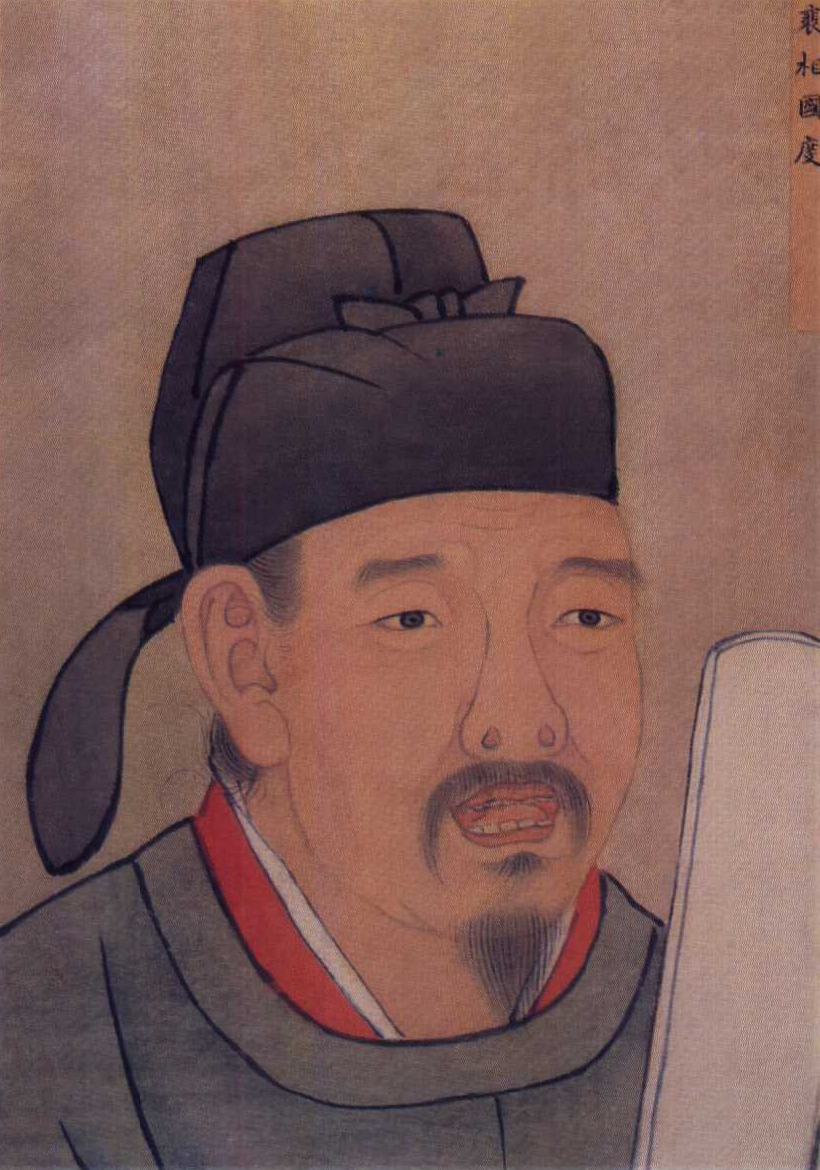
Pei Du

Pei Du (Chinese: 裴度; 765 – April 21, 839), courtesy name Zhongli (中立), posthumous name Duke Wenzhong of Jin (晉文忠公), was a Chinese politician and government official of the Tang dynasty, serving as a chancellor during the reigns of Emperor Xianzong, Emperor Muzong, Emperor Jingzong and Emperor Wenzong. Although Pei was a civilian official, he was also known for his military strategies, and he is best known for being in charge of the campaign against the warlord Wu Yuanji during Emperor Xianzong's reign.

== Background ==
Pei Du was born in 765, during the reign of Emperor Daizong. His family was from Hedong (河東, in modern Yuncheng, Shanxi) and traced his ancestry back to a line of government officials dating back to the Han Dynasty, Jin Dynasty (266–420), Former Yan, Later Qin, and Northern Wei, although Pei Du's direct ancestors was not listed with governmental offices for several generations until his grandfather Pei Youlin (裴有鄰), who served as a county magistrate, and his father Pei Xu (裴漵) served as a county secretary general.

In 789, during the reign of Emperor Daizong's son Emperor Dezong, Pei Du passed the imperial examinations and the special examination for grand speech. He later further passed special examinations for those who could properly criticize the government. He was thereafter made the sheriff of Heyin County (河陰, in modern Luoyang, Henan), and thereafter was made an imperial censor with the title Jiancha Yushi (監察御史). At one point, he submitted a secret petition that criticized those who were powerful due to their associations with Emperor Dezong, and thus was sent out of the capital Chang'an to serve as an administrator at the Henan Municipality (河南, i.e., the Luoyang region) government. He later became an imperial archiver (起居舍人, Qiju Sheren).

== During Emperor Xianzong's reign ==
In 811, during the reign of Emperor Dezong's grandson Emperor Xianzong, Pei Du was made Sifeng Yuanwailang (司封員外郎), a low-level official at the ministry of civil service affairs (吏部, Libu), and put in charge of drafting edicts. He was soon promoted to be Sifeng Langzhong (司封郎中), a supervisorial official at the ministry of civil service affairs.

In 812, after Tian Xing the military governor (Jiedushi) of Weibo Circuit (魏博, headquartered in modern Handan, Hebei) submitted his circuit to imperial orders (previously, under Tian Xing's predecessor Tian Ji'an and prior military governors, Weibo had been governed in a de facto independent manner from the imperial government), Emperor Xianzong sent Pei to Weibo to comfort Tian Xing and the soldiers and to give a large cash reward to the Weibo soldiers. It was said that while at Weibo, Pei often spoke of the ways of faithfulness to Tian Xing, and that Tian Xing was attentive to Pei's encouragement. After Pei returned from the mission to Weibo, he was made Zhongshu Sheren (中書舍人), a mid-level official at the legislative bureau of government (中書省, Zhongshu Sheng).

In 814, Pei was made deputy chief imperial censor (御史中丞, Yushi Zhongcheng). While serving in that office, there was an occasion in spring 815 when he interceded on behalf of the exiled official Liu Yuxi, who was set to be made the prefect of Bo Prefecture (播州, in modern Zunyi, Guizhou), pointing out that, as Liu Yuxi's friend Liu Zongyuan, who was also to be exiled and who had offered to go to Bo Prefecture in Liu Yuxi's stead, that Bo Prefecture was so remote that Liu Yuxi could not possibly take his mother with him, and further pointing out that Emperor Xianzong himself also still had to support his mother (Empress Dowager Wang). Emperor Xianzong thus made Liu Yuxi the prefect of the somewhat less remote Lian Prefecture (連州, in modern Qingyuan, Guangdong).

By that point, Emperor Xianzong was deeply involved in a campaign against the warlord Wu Yuanji, who controlled Zhangyi Circuit (彰義, headquartered in modern Zhumadian, Henan). He sent Pei to the front to observe the campaign. Upon return, Pei reported his belief that Wu could be defeated, and further commended the general Li Guangyan for his bravery and righteousness. When Li Guangyan subsequently often had victories against Zhangyi troops, Emperor Xianzong came to believe Pei to have good judgment of character.

In winter 815, assassins killed the chancellor Wu Yuanheng, who had been in charge of the campaign against Wu Yuanji; on the same morning, assassins tried to kill Pei as well, injuring Pei's head and causing Pei to fall into a ditch, but Pei's head was protected by a thick hat, allowing him to survive the attack. There was suggestions by some officials that Pei should be removed from office to appease Wu Yuanji's allies Wang Chengzong the military governor of Chengde Circuit (成德, headquartered in modern Shijiazhuang, Hebei) and Li Shidao the military governor of Pinglu Circuit (平盧, headquartered in modern Tai'an, Shandong). Emperor Xianzong rejected such talk, stating, "If I remove Pei Du from office, it will fulfill the desires of the treacherous, and the imperial government will no longer have any authority. My having Pei Du is sufficient to destroy the two bandits." He made Pei Zhongshu Shilang (中書侍郎), the deputy head of the legislative bureau, as well as de facto chancellor with the title Tong Zhongshu Menxia Pingzhangshi (同中書門下平章事). Subsequently, when Pei pointed out that then-overall commander of the campaign against Wu Yuanji, Yan Shou (嚴綬), was incompetent, Emperor Xianzong made Han Hong the military governor of Xuanwu Circuit (宣武, headquartered in modern Kaifeng, Henan) overall commander instead.

Pei continued to be a steadfast advocate for continuing the campaign against Wu Yuanji. In summer 816, after the imperial general Gao Xiayu (高霞寓) suffered a major defeat against Zhangyi troops, there were renewed talks among officials that the campaign should end. Emperor Xianzong was said to continue to follow Pei's advice, and Emperor Xianzong spoke sternly against those who suggested ending the campaign.

In winter 816, after the official Wang E (王鍔) died and offered much of his wealth to the imperial government, two servants of Wang's made a report that Wang Ji (王稷) had secretly modified Wang's will and hid some of the assets. Emperor Xianzong was set to send eunuchs to investigate this report, but Pei pointed out that Wang E had already offered a large amount of wealth, and investigations would cause all other officials to worry about what would happen after they died. Emperor Xianzong agreed, ended the investigation, and had Wang's servants executed.

As of fall 817, the campaign against Zhangyi was still ongoing without ultimate success. Pei's colleague Li Fengji advocated ending the campaign on account of army fatigue and treasury depletion. Pei, instead, offered to personally head to the front to oversee the campaign. Emperor Xianzong agreed, and, while Han remained titular overall commander, Pei was effectively put in charge and given a staff of talented officials and military officers, and he was also made the military governor of Zhangyi in anticipation of victory. When he wanted to take the general Zhang Maohe (張茂和, a son of the general Zhang Xiaozhong) as a subordinate, Zhang was fearful and declined. Pei requested that Zhang be executed for refusing a direct order, but Emperor Xianzong spared Zhang and only exiled him. Also, as Pei was concerned that the imperial scholar Linghu Chu would cooperate with Li Fengji in opposing the campaign after he left Chang'an, he accused Linghu of using inappropriate language on Pei's commissioning edict and had Linghu demoted. Before Pei departed, he stated to Emperor Xianzong:

If the bandit [i.e., Wu Yuanji] can be destroyed, your subject will still have a chance to come back to the heavenly court. For as long as he exists, I will never return.

Emperor Xianzong was greatly touched and shed tears.

Once Pei reached the front, he saw that the generals were hesitant to make their own decisions because they were being monitored by eunuchs sent by Emperor Xianzong. At Pei's request, the eunuch monitors were recalled, and it was said that only thereafter did the generals dare to make their own decisions. While Pei was at the front, there was an occasion when a surprise attack by the Zhangyi general Dong Chongzhi (董重質) nearly killed him, but he was protected by Li Guangyan and Tian Bu (Tian Xing's son) and escaped the attack.

Meanwhile, one of the imperial generals, Li Su the military governor of Tangsuideng Circuit (唐隨鄧, headquartered in modern Zhumadian) was planning a surprise attack on Zhangyi's capital Cai Prefecture (蔡州). When Li Su reported this plan to Pei, Pei approved of it. In winter 817, Li Su launched his attack and captured Cai Prefecture, taking Wu Yuanji captive and delivering him to Chang'an. When Pei subsequently arrived at Cai Prefecture, Li Su waited by the road to be ready to pay proper respect to Pei by military ceremony. Pei initially, in humility, wanted to avoid having Li Su bow to him, but Li Su pointed out that it was proper for them to demonstrate the proper etiquette for the imperial army before the surrendered soldiers and people of Cai Prefecture. Pei thus agreed.

During the brief time that Pei was at Cai Prefecture, he used the Cai Prefecture soldiers as his own guards. When there was warning by his subordinates that there were still many rebellious individuals in the Cai Prefecture army, Pei laughed and responded:

I am the military governor of Zhangyi. Now that the prime criminal has been captured, the people of Cai Prefecture are my people. Why should I be suspicious of them?

It was said that Pei's attitude touched the people of Cai Prefecture. Further, as during the rule of Wu Yuanji and his father Wu Shaoyang the people of Cai Prefecture were under strict regulations not to congregate, not to light candles at night, and not to hold feasts, Pei repealed all of these regulations. It was said that only then was some measure of normal life restored to the people of Cai Prefecture.

Around the new year 818, Emperor Xianzong was then set to recall Pei. Pei made his officer Ma Zong (馬總) the acting military governor and departed Cai Prefecture. On the way, he encountered the imperial eunuch Liang Shouqian (梁守謙), who had been bestowed two swords and given order to execute Wu Yuanji's former officers. Pei accompanied Liang back to Cai Prefecture and, not following Emperor Xianzong's orders in entirety, carried out punishment according to the faults of the officers rather than executing them. Only after doing so did he again depart Cai Prefecture. Emperor Xianzong thereafter created Pei the Duke of Jin and recalled him to Chang'an to again be chancellor.

While Pei was still at Zhangyi, his subordinate Han Yu recommended the commoner Bo Qi (柏耆) for a mission to persuade Wang Chengzong (whom Emperor Xianzong had believed to have been behind Wu Yuanheng's assassination and therefore declared a campaign against as well) to submit to imperial orders. Pei agreed and sent Bo. Wang, who was fearful after Wu Yuanji's destruction, sent his sons as hostages and surrendered two of his six prefectures to imperial control, offering to submit to imperial orders. Emperor Xianzong, after Tian Xing (whose name had been changed to Tian Hongzheng by this point) spoke in favor, agreed.

In 818, when Emperor Xianzong commissioned the imperial guards to construct a number of palaces, the imperial guard generals Zhang Fengguo (張奉國) and Li Wenyue (李文悅), believing that the realm was not yet peaceful, did not want the constructions to commence, and so reported this to the chancellors. Pei advised Emperor Xianzong to stop the constructions, but Emperor Xianzong became angry and did not agree with Pei. He moved Zhang and Li Wenyue to other positions and then commenced the constructions anyway. However, he continued to rely on Pei's advice on military matters, and Pei's colleague Li Yijian, believing himself to be less capable than Pei, offered to resign. Li Yijian was thus sent out of Chang'an to serve as the military governor of Huainan Circuit (淮南, headquartered in modern Yangzhou, Jiangsu). Emperor Xianzong subsequently commissioned the officials Huangfu Bo and Cheng Yi as chancellors. As both Huangfu and Cheng had received imperial favor because of their gathering of money for the palace treasury. Pei, believing that neither was suitable to be chancellor and being ashamed to be chancellor with them, opposed the move. Emperor Xianzong disbelieved Pei and commissioned Huangfu and Cheng as chancellors anyway.

After Wang submitted to imperial orders, Li Shidao also offered to surrender three of his 12 prefectures and submit to imperial orders, but soon reneged on the offer. Emperor Xianzong thus declared a general campaign against Li Shidao. During the campaign, Tian Hongzheng offered to immediately attack Li Shidao, but Pei, pointing out to Emperor Xianzong that if he did so, per regulations at the time, the Weibo soldiers would have to be supplied by the imperial treasury immediately. He thus suggested that Weibo soldiers be kept at Weibo until winter 818. Emperor Xianzong agreed, and when Tian finally launched his attack in winter 818, the attack was effective and crossed the Yellow River into Pinglu territory. In spring 819, Li Shidao's subordinate Liu Wu killed Li Shidao and surrendered Pinglu to imperial control.

After the campaign against Pinglu was complete, it was said that because of various accusations that Huangfu and his associates made against Pei, Pei was sent out of Chang'an to serve as the military governor of Hedong Circuit (河東, headquartered in modern Taiyuan, Shandong) and the mayor of its capital Taiyuan Municipality, continuing to carry the title of chancellor as an honorary title.

== During Emperor Muzong's reign ==
In 821, during the reign of Emperor Xianzong's son Emperor Muzong, Chengde and Lulong (盧龍, headquartered in modern Beijing) soldiers rebelled under the leadership of Wang Tingcou and Zhu Kerong, respectively, killing Tian Hongzheng (whom Emperor Muzong had transferred to Chengde) and imprisoning Zhang Hongjing (a former chancellor that Emperor Muzong had transferred to Lulong). Emperor Muzong put Pei Du in command of the overall operations against Chengde and Lulong, but soon effectively gave that responsibility to Du Shuliang (杜叔良) as Du was put in command of the armies trying to relieve Niu Yuanyi (牛元翼), the prefect of Shen Prefecture (深州, in modern Hengshui, Hebei), who was holding out against Wang. Further, it was said that the imperial scholar Yuan Zhen, who wanted to be chancellor, and the eunuch Wei Hongjian (魏弘簡), were apprehensive that if Pei were victorious, he would again be in charge of the government, and thus interfered with requests that Pei submitted to Emperor Muzong. When Pei submitted an accusation against Yuan and Wei, Emperor Muzong felt compelled to demote Wei and strip Yuan of his status as imperial scholar, but was said to continue to trust Yuan. Nevertheless, with the imperial forces paralyzed by their need to receive imperial approval on decisions the generals were making and unable to prevail over Wang and Zhu, despite having a large numerical advantage and despite the presence of Pei and capable generals Wu Chongyin and Li Guangyan. By 822, Emperor Muzong abandoned the campaign and commissioned Zhu, then Wang, as military governors of their circuits. (It was said that his doing so was also at Yuan's behest, as Yuan did not want to see Pei continue to wield military command.) Despite their receiving commissions, Zhu and Wang did not relent on their siege of Shen Prefecture. Pei sent them letters rebuking them, and Zhu subsequently withdrew. Wang continued his pressure on Niu, however, and Niu eventually had to fight his way out of the siege.)

After the campaign ended, Pei was initially made Sikong (司空, one of the Three Excellencies) and defender of Luoyang, continuing to carry the honorary chancellor title. After the advisorial officials submitted many petitions pointing out that Pei had both civilian and military talents and should not be left in a largely ceremonial position, Emperor Muzong did not change Pei's commission initially but ordered him to first report to Chang'an to meet the emperor before heading for Luoyang. While Pei was at Chang'an, he apologized for being unable to defeat Wang and Zhu. Meanwhile, around the same time, Liu Wu, who had been made the military governor of Zhaoyi Circuit (昭義, headquartered in modern Changzhi, Shanxi), had detained the imperial eunuch monitor Li Chengjie (李承偕) after Li Chengjie had disrespected him and further plotted with his subordinate Zhang Wen (張汶) to arrest him and replace him with Zhang. Pei suggested issuing an edict executing Li Chengjie, believing that such a move would regain Liu's faithfulness to the imperial government, but Emperor Muzong, as both he and his mother Empress Dowager Guo favored Li Chengjie, did not do so. Rather, he accepted Pei's alternative suggestion to order that Li Chengjie be exiled. Only after such an edict was issued did Liu release Li Chengjie, but thereafter Liu began to disobey imperial orders. Shortly after the incident involving Liu Wu, Pei was commissioned to serve as the military governor of Huainan Circuit. However, the advisorial officials again petitioned to keep Pei at the central government. Emperor Muzong thus kept Pei at the capital as chancellor and sent Wang Bo to Huainan instead.

However, an incident shortly after would lead to both Pei and Yuan (who had been made chancellor by this point as well) both losing their chancellor positions. During the Chengde campaign, the official Yu Fang (于方) had suggested to Yuan that emissaries be sent to Chengde to persuade Wang Tingcou's officers to release the siege against Shen Prefecture. Soon, however, a rumor developed that Yu and Yuan were plotting to assassinate Pei. One Li Shang (李賞) reported the rumored plot to Pei, but Pei took no heed of it. Li Shang instead reported it to the imperial Shence Army. Emperor Muzong ordered an investigation, headed by the official Han Gao (韓皋). No positive evidence that Yu and Yuan plotted to assassinate Pei was discovered, but both Pei and Yuan were relieved of their chancellor duties, with Pei being made You Pushe (右僕射), one of the heads of the executive bureau (尚書省, Shangshu Sheng), and Yuan made the prefect of Tong Prefecture (同州, in modern Weinan, Shaanxi). When advisorial officials again objected, Emperor Muzong stripped Yuan of his additional title as director of Changchun Palace (長春宮) but left the orders otherwise unchanged. Li Fengji was made chancellor.

In winter 822, Emperor Muzong suffered a stroke after being shocked by the accidental death of a eunuch at a polo game. As he was unable to rule on the petitions by the officials, the government was thrown into confusion and alarm. At the urging of Pei and Li Fengji, Emperor Muzong created his oldest son Li Zhan crown prince.

It was said that because Li Fengji disliked Pei, and his associates often criticized Pei, In 823, Pei was sent out of the capital to serve as the military governor of Shannan West Circuit (山南西道, headquartered in modern Hanzhong, Shaanxi). However, contrary to the customs at the time when former chancellors were sent out to be military governors, he was not given an honorary chancellor title.

== During Emperor Jingzong's reign ==
In 824, by which time Emperor Muzong had died and been succeeded by Li Zhan (as Emperor Jingzong), Wang Tingcou, upon hearing the Niu Yuanyi, who had been serving as the military governor of Shannan East Circuit (山南東道, headquartered in modern Xiangfan, Hubei), had died, slaughtered Niu's family, which he had detained at Chengde. Emperor Jingzong, hearing reports of the Niu household being slaughtered, sighed and blamed the incident on the chancellors' lack of ability. The imperial scholar Wei Chuhou pointed out that Pei Du had great accomplishments but had been squeezed out of the chancellorship. Further, Emperor Jingzong saw that whenever Pei submitted reports, he did not list an honorary chancellor title among his titles. Wei blamed Li Fengji's machinations for this, and the chancellor Li Cheng also advised that Pei should be shown more respect. Emperor Jingzong thus conferred the honorary chancellor title on Pei, although he did not recall Pei at that time.

In winter 825, after Emperor Jingzong had sent several messengers to Shannan West's capital Xingyuan Municipality (興元) to confer with Pei and secretly asking him to request a trip to Chang'an to pay homage to the emperor, Pei did so. He arrived in Chang'an in spring 826, and, despite attacks Li Fengji and his partisans laid on Pei (including intimations that Pei had been prophesied to be emperor and was having designs on the throne), Pei was again made chancellor. Under Pei's advice, Emperor Jingzong abandoned his plans to visit Luoyang (after Pei pointed out the expenses it would take to repair the palaces at Luoyang and the palaces on the way from Chang'an to Luoyang). Meanwhile, at that time, both Wang Tingcou and Zhu Kerong were submitted impolite petitions that, on the surface, offered to send troops to help repair Luoyang's defenses, but were intending to threaten the imperial government, Emperor Jingzong, per Pei's advice, acted without undue alarm and simply declined their offers.

== During Emperor Wenzong's reign ==
Around the new year 827, Emperor Jingzong was assassinated by the eunuch Su Zuoming (蘇佐明). The eunuch Liu Keming (劉克明) wanted to support Emperor Jingzong's brother Li Wu the Prince of Jiàng as emperor, but another faction of eunuchs, headed by Wang Shoucheng, Yang Chenghe (楊承和), Wei Congjian (魏從簡), and Liang Shouqian (梁守謙), killed Liu, Li Wu, and Liu's associates, and instead supported another brother of Emperor Jingzong's, Li Han the Prince of Jiāng (note different tone than Li Wu's title) as emperor (as Emperor Wenzong). Before Emperor Wenzong could formally take the throne, Pei served as regent for three days.

Meanwhile, around this time, Li Quanlüe (李全略) the military governor of Henghai Circuit (橫海, headquartered in modern Cangzhou, Hebei) had also died, and his son Li Tongjie tried to take control of the circuit. Emperor Wenzong tried to induce Li Tongjie not to do so by offering him the military governorship of Yanhai Circuit (兗海, headquartered in modern Jining, Shandong), but Li Tongjie refused. Emperor Wenzong ordered the military governors of the circuits around Henghai to attack Li Tongjie. Of those, Shi Xiancheng the military governor of Weibo was secretly in communication with Li Tongjie, as the two families had a marital relationship, but Pei, not knowing this, believed Shi to be dependable. Wei Chuhou, who was also chancellor by this point, however, told Shi's emissaries that he was aware of Shi's communications with Li Tongjie, and Shi thus did not dare to openly aid Li Tongjie.

In 829, when Li Deyu the governor of Zhexi Circuit (浙西, headquartered in modern Zhenjiang, Jiangsu) was recalled to serve as deputy minister of defense, Pei recommended Li Deyu to be chancellor, but due to the eunuchs' recommendations, another deputy minister, Li Zongmin, was made chancellor instead. Subsequently, by this point, Pei was also serving as the director of finances. His colleague Lu Sui, however, opined that chancellors should not also handle financial matters, pointing out the prior examples of Yang Guozhong, Yuan Zai, and Huangfu Bo. Pei thus resigned his post as director of finances, but remained as chancellor.

In 830, Pei, as he was old by this point, offered to resign his chancellorship. Emperor Wenzong, in response, made him Situ (司徒, also one of the Three Excellencies) and gave him the unusual chancellor title of Pingzhang Junguo Zhongshi (平章軍國重事), ordering him to report for duties only once every three or five days. Soon thereafter, however, as Li Zongmin resented Pei for having recommended Li Deyu over him, he had Pei sent out of the capital to serve as the military governor of Shannan East Circuit, carrying the honorary chancellor title of Shizhong (侍中). Once he reported to Shannan East Circuit, at his request, a large grazing range at Shannan East that was used to breed military horses, which was not yielding much results, was abolished, and the fields were returned to the farmers. In 834, he was made the defender of Luoyang. In 835, he was given the honorary chancellor title of Zhongshu Ling (中書令). Later that year, after a major outward clash of between the officials headed by Zheng Zhu and Li Xun and the powerful eunuchs, known as the Ganlu Incident, led to the deaths of four chancellors (Li Xun, Wang Ya, Jia Su, and Shu Yuanyu) and massive eunuch reprisals against those viewed as Zheng's and Li Xun's associates, Pei urged leniency, and it was said that some 10 families were spared because of his efforts.

In 837, Pei was again made the military governor of Hedong Circuit as well as the mayor of Taiyuan. Pei declined on the basis that he was too old to command an army, but Emperor Wenzong did not agree, issuing an edict that praised Pei but not changing the orders, so Pei was required to report to Hedong. In winter 838, he grew ill, and he requested to return to Luoyang to try to recuperate. In spring 839, Emperor Wenzong instead recalled him to Chang'an to serve as chancellor with the title of Zhongshu Ling. After he arrived at Chang'an, however, he was too ill to receive the commission officially and was permitted to return home. He died shortly after and was given great posthumous honors. When Emperor Wenzong inquired about why Pei did not have a final petition as was customary for officials at the time prior to death, Pei's family submitted a draft that he had partially written — in which Pei had expressed concerns that Emperor Wenzong did not yet create a crown prince, and in which Pei did not make requests on behalf of family members — as was also customary at the time. Pei Du had 7 sons. The old book of Tang and new book of Tang only included 5 of them and thus omitted 2 remaining sons. However, the list of chancellors of new book of Tang listed all 7 of his male children. Historians did not say anything about his female offspring.

== Notes and references ==
- Old Book of Tang, vol. 170.
- New Book of Tang, vol. 173.
- Zizhi Tongjian, vols. 239, 240, 241, 242, 243, 244, 245, 246.
