= Wang Chengyuan =

Wang Chengyuan (Chinese: 王承元) (801 – February 3, 834) formally the Duke of Qi (岐公), was a Chinese military general and politician during the Tang dynasty. His family had, for generations, controlled Chengde Circuit (成德, headquartered in modern Shijiazhuang, Hebei), but he declined the command of Chengde after the death of his older brother Wang Chengzong. He subsequently served as a general under imperial command until his death.

== Before Wang Chengzong's death ==
Wang Chengyuan was born in 801, during the reign of Emperor Dezong. He was a son of Wang Shizhen, who, around the time, took over as military governor (Jiedushi) of Chengde after the death of Wang Chengyuan's grandfather Wang Wujun. He had two elder brothers Wang Chengzong, Wang Chengxi (王承系) and at least three younger brothers — Wang Chengtong (王承通), Wang Chengdi (王承迪), and Wang Chengrong (王承榮).

After Wang Shizhen died in 809, Wang Chengzong took over control of the circuit but was initially denied imperial sanction to succeed Wang Shizhen. Wang Chengzong received such imperial sanction in 810, however, after a failed imperial campaign against him. In 816, at Wang Chengzong's request, Wang Chengyuan was made deputy governor. When the imperial government declared a general campaign against Wang Chengzong's former ally Li Shidao the military governor of Pinglu Circuit (平盧, headquartered in modern Tai'an, Shandong), he advised Wang Chengzong to send 2,000 to aid the imperial campaign against Li. Wang Chengzong did not accept the advice on account of Wang Chengyuan's youth, but it was said that the army thereafter often looked to him for his opinions.

== After Wang Chengzong's death ==
In winter 820, Wang Chengzong died, and initially, his subordinates kept his death a secret. At that time, Wang Chengzong's two sons Wang Zhigan (王知感) and Wang Zhixin (王知信) were serving as hostages at the capital Chang'an. The Chengde officers wanted one of their own to succeed Wang Chengzong, and Wang Chengzong's staff member Cui Sui (崔燧) declared an order in the name of Wang Wujun's wife Lady Li, the Lady of Liang, declaring Wang Chengyuan successor to Wang Chengzong. When the officers bowed to Wang Chengyuan, Wang Chengyuan initially tearfully declined and requested a consultation with the imperial eunuch monitor of the army. The monitor arrived and also urged him to accept the officers' submission. Wang, after receiving a promise from the officers that they would be loyal to the imperial cause, accepted — but took office using his title of commander of the army rather than acting military governor. He also secretly submitted a petition to Emperor Muzong that the imperial government send a permanent replacement for him. In response, Emperor Muzong issued a number of military governor commissions involving Chengde and nearby circuits — transferring Tian Hongzheng the military governor of nearby Weibo Circuit (魏博, headquartered in modern Handan, Hebei) to Chengde, making Wang Chengyuan the military governor of Yicheng Circuit (義成, headquartered in modern Anyang, Henan), transferring Liu Wu the military governor of Yicheng to Zhaoyi Circuit (昭義, headquartered in modern Changzhi, Shanxi), transferring Li Su the military governor of Wuning Circuit (武寧, headquartered in modern Xuzhou, Jiangsu) to Weibo, and making Tian Hongzheng's son Tian Bu the military governor of Heyang Circuit (河陽, headquartered in modern Jiaozuo, Henan). Wang Chengzong was also made the prefect of Yicheng's capital prefecture Hua Prefecture (滑州).

When the imperial official Bo Qi (柏耆) arrived to declare the orders, the soldiers were initially clamoring and not willing to accept the orders. Wang Chengyuan urged them to accept, citing the example of how Li Shidao's officers had initially not allowed him to accept imperial orders, but later killed him and surrendered to imperial forces when they attacked. When some officers, led by Li Ji (李寂), nevertheless tried to keep him from leaving, he executed them. He soon departed Chengde and headed for Yicheng. Some of his staff members tried to carry valuable possession from Chengde, and he ordered them to leave such possessions at Chengde. Four brothers or cousins of Wang Chengyuans were commissioned as prefectural prefects, and four were commissioned as imperial officials. When Lady Li went to pay homage to Emperor Muzong, Emperor Muzong ordered a feast be held for her inside the palace and gave her much rewards.

After mutineers at Chengde, led by Wang Tingcou, assassinated Tian Hongzheng in 821, as part of the subsequent movement of military governors in a campaign against Wang Tingcou (which subsequently ended in failure), Wang Chengyuan was transferred to Fufang Circuit (鄜坊, headquartered in modern Yan'an, Shaanxi). On the way to Fufang, he went to Chang'an to pay homage to Emperor Muzong, who approved of his behavior and met him on several occasions. Soon thereafter, he was transferred to Fengxiang Circuit (鳳翔, headquartered in modern Baoji, Shaanxi). At that time, because Fengxiang Circuit's land was flat, Tufan forces often were able to invade without obstacles. Wang Chengyuan built a fort, Fort Linqian (臨汧城), at a key strategic point to try to control such incursions. He was subsequently created the Duke of Qi. He also built a city east of the circuit capital Fengxiang to house the merchants who often travelled through the circuit. When his grandmother Lady Li died early in the Taihe (太和) era (827-835) of Emperor Muzong's son Emperor Wenzong, she was buried with much honor.

In 831, Wang was transferred to Pinglu Circuit (which had been divided into three circuits and whose headquarters had by that point been moved to modern Weifang, Shandong). At that point, the salt monopoly that the imperial government imposed on most of the realm was not imposed in the region, and Wang offered that the salt sales be transferred to the imperial authorities for the salt monopoly. His offer was accepted, and was soon also applied to the other two circuits carved out of Pinglu (Tianping (天平, headquartered in modern Tai'an) and Yanhai (兗海, headquartered in modern Jining, Shandong)). It was said that Wang was lenient and gracious, and wherever he went, he governed well. He died in 834 while still serving as the military governor of Pinglu. He was given posthumous honors.

== Notes and references ==
- Old Book of Tang, vol. 142.
- New Book of Tang, vol. 148.
- Zizhi Tongjian, vol. 241.
