= Liu Wu (general) =

- 劉悟

Military Governor (Jiedushi) of Zhaoyi Circuit
- In office 820–825
- Monarch: Emperor Muzong of Tang
- Succeeded by: Liu Congjian

Prince of Pengcheng
- Monarch: Emperor Xianzong of Tang

Personal details
- Occupation: Military general, politician, monarch

Liu Wu (Chinese: 劉悟; died September 25, 825), noble title Prince of Pengcheng (彭城王), was a Chinese military general and politician of the Tang dynasty, whose killing of his superior, the warlord Li Shidao, and subsequent submission to the imperial government, were the high point of Emperor Xianzong's campaign to end warlordism. During the subsequent reign of Emperor Muzong, however, Liu, angered by a conspiracy between an imperial eunuch and one of his subordinates, drifted away from the imperial government and ruled Zhaoyi Circuit (昭義; headquartered in modern-day Changzhi, Shanxi) semi-independently.

== Background ==
It is not known when Liu Wu was born. His grandfather Liu Zhengchen (劉正臣) had served as the Tang military governor (jiedushi) of Pinglu Circuit (平盧, then headquartered in modern Chaoyang, Liaoning) during the Anshi Rebellion and combatted the army of the rebel Yan, but was unable to capture the Yan northern capital Fanyang before being poisoned by his own subordinate Wang Xuanzhi (王玄志). During the time that Liu Wu's uncle Liu Quanliang (劉全諒) served as the military governor of Xuanwu Circuit (宣武, headquartered in modern Kaifeng, Henan), as he valued Liu Wu for Liu Wu's bravery and decisiveness, he made Liu Wu an officer under him, but Liu Wu subsequently committed a crime and fled to Zhaoyi Circuit (昭義, headquartered in modern Changzhi, Shanxi), where the military governor of Zhaoyi, Wang Qianxiu (王虔休), made him an officer. Liu Wu soon became ill and resigned, and he went to the eastern capital Luoyang. Liu Quanliang had a storage of money at Luoyang, and Liu Wu broke into it and spent it. Liu Wu also associated with violent young men who killed people and dogs. As a result, Liu Wu was arrested and held at the jail of Henan Municipality (河南, i.e., the Luoyang region), but the defender of Luoyang Wei Xiaqing (韋夏卿) released him.

== Service under Li Shigu and Li Shidao ==
Liu Wu subsequently fled to Pinglu Circuit (by this point headquartered in modern Tai'an, Shandong) to serve under the military governor Li Shigu, who ruled the circuit in de facto independence from the imperial government. Liu was not initially well known in the Pinglu army. On one occasion, when the officers were playing polo, his horse charged Li Shigu's horse, causing Li Shigu's horse to fall. Li Shigu, in anger, was set to execute him. Liu responded with proud words without fear. Li Shigu was amazed and pardoned him, and found a wife for him. He thereafter was promoted several times, until he became army commander (兵馬使, Bingmashi).

In 818, after Emperor Xianzong declared a general campaign against Li Shigu's brother and successor Li Shidao, Li Shidao had Liu command troops to defend against imperial armies' attack, in position at Cao Prefecture (曹州, in modern Heze, Shandong). It was said that Liu was lenient and simplified the military laws, and as a result the soldiers were happy to be under his command—such that he was referred to as "Father Liu." After Tian Hongzheng the military governor of Weibo Circuit (魏博, headquartered in modern Handan, Hebei) crossed the Yellow River and pressured Pinglu's capital Yun Prefecture (鄆州) directly in winter 818, Liu stationed his army at Yanggu (陽穀, in modern Liaocheng, Shandong) to defend against Tian. Tian's army repeatedly prevailed over Liu's, and there were accusations by some of Li Shidao's associates that Liu was plotting against him. Li Shidao thus summoned Liu back to Yun Prefecture under the guise of a strategic meeting but planned to execute him. Yet other associates of Li Shidao's counseled that if he put Liu to death without proof of treachery, no one would remain faithful to him. After keeping Liu at Yun Prefecture for 10 days, Li Shidao ordered him to return to Yanggu and gave him gifts to try to secure his loyalty. However, because Liu Wu's son Liu Congjian served in Li Shidao's guard corps, he found out about what Li Shidao had originally intended and reported it to Liu Wu, so Liu Wu secretly took precautions.

In spring 819, Li Shidao became resolved to kill Liu Wu. He sent two messengers to Liu's deputy Zhang Xian (張暹), ordering Zhang to execute Liu and take over the army. When the messengers informed Zhang, Zhang, who was friendly with Liu, secretly informed Liu, who immediately put the two messengers to death. Liu then called a meeting with all of his officers, declaring that he was set to turn against Li Shidao and follow imperial orders. When some officers hesitated, he executed them, as well as a number of others that soldiers had resented. The other officers were intimidated into submission. At night, they launched a surprise attack on Yun Prefecture, and the Yun Prefecture defenders, believing that Liu was returning on Li Shidao's orders, allowed them in. Liu Wu controlled the city and arrested Li Shidao and his two sons, putting them to death. He then sent messengers to surrender to Tian, but continued to maintain control over Yun Prefecture.

== As jiedushi ==
Because Emperor Xianzong had previously issued an edict stating that whoever killed Li Shidao would be conferred all of Li Shidao's titles, Liu Wu believed that he would be given Pinglu's 12 prefectures, and therefore started making personnel changes for the entire circuit. Meanwhile, though, Emperor Xianzong was secretly planning to divide Pinglu into three circuits and transferring Liu elsewhere, but was concerned that Liu might resist. He ordered Tian to evaluate the situation, and Tian thus sent messengers to Liu, ostensibly to befriend Liu, but secretly to observe Liu. As Liu was strong and liked arm wrestling, within three days, he was encouraging soldiers to arm wrestle and watching them doing so in excitement. When the Weibo messengers reported this back to Tian, Tian opined to Emperor Xianzong that Liu, if transferred elsewhere, would not resist. Soon thereafter, Emperor Xianzong issued an edict commissioning Liu as the military governor of Yicheng Circuit (義成, headquartered in modern Anyang, Henan). Liu was surprised and decided to submit—and, as soon as he left the city, Tian, approaching with Weibo and other circuits' troops, met him and gave him the seals of the Yicheng governorship. Liu took with him several colleagues who had unsuccessfully counseled Li Shidao not to resist imperial authority—Li Gongdu (李公度), Li Cun (李存), Guo Hu (郭昈), and Jia Zhiyan (賈直言)—with him, and invited them to serve under him at Yicheng. Liu's submission to imperial authority was considered the apex of Emperor Xianzong's campaign to end warlordism in his realm, referred to historians as the Yuanhe Restoration (元和中興, Yuanhe being Emperor Xianzong's era name). Emperor Xianzong created Liu the Prince of Pengcheng and awarded him a mansion and an estate. In spring 820, Liu went to Chang'an to pay homage to Emperor Xianzong.

Late in 820, by which time Emperor Xianzong had died and been succeeded by his son Emperor Muzong, Wang Chengzong the military governor of Chengde Circuit (成德, headquartered in modern Shijiazhuang, Hebei) died. His brother Wang Chengyuan, fearing the fate of Li Shidao, offered to surrender the circuit's control to the imperial government. Emperor Muzong, as a result, made a number of transfers of military governors around Chengde—transferring Tian to Chengde, Wang Chengyuan to Yicheng, Liu to Zhaoyi Circuit, and Li Su the military governor of Wuning Circuit (武寧, headquartered in modern Xuzhou, Jiangsu), and also making Tian's son Tian Bu the military governor of Heyang Circuit (河陽, headquartered in modern Jiaozuo, Henan). In 821, after soldiers at Lulong Circuit (盧龍, headquartered in modern Beijing) mutinied and put the imperially-commissioned military governor Zhang Hongjing under house arrest and supported the officer Zhu Kerong to take over the circuit, Emperor Muzong made Liu the military governor of Lulong, intending to have him suppress the mutiny, but Liu, fearing the strength of Zhu's troops, declined, suggesting that Zhu be commissioned. Emperor Muzong thus allowed Liu to remain at Zhaoyi.

Meanwhile, the eunuch monitor of the army that Emperor Muzong stationed at Zhaoyi, Liu Chengjie (劉承偕), because of the favor that both Emperor Muzong and the emperor's mother Empress Dowager Guo showed him, was arrogant and often insulted Liu Wu, and allowed his subordinates to disobey the law. He also conspired with Liu Wu's subordinate Zhang Wen (張汶) the prefect of Ci Prefecture (磁州, in modern Handan) to arrest Liu Wu and let Zhang replace him. When Liu Wu found out about this, he encouraged his subordinates to act against Liu Chengjie and Zhang, and in a subsequent mutiny, soldiers killed Zhang and arrested Liu Chengjie, intending to kill him as well. Jia, however, warned Liu Wu:

What are you doing, Lord? Are you following the example of Sikong Li [(Sikong (司空) being one of the honorary titles that Li Shidao carried)]? How do you know that there are not those in the army who will follow your example, Lord? If Sikong Li still is aware of this underground, I think he would laugh at you.

Liu Wu thanked Jia for his honest advice and did not kill Liu Chengjie, but instead only kept him under arrest. Emperor Muzong ordered Liu Wu to deliver Liu Chengjie to Chang'an, and Liu Wu refused, claiming that if he did, the soldiers would mutiny again. At the advice of the chancellor Pei Du, who was also aware of Liu Chengjie's arrogance and improper activities, suggested to Emperor Muzong that he ordered that Liu Chengjie be executed, to maintain the faith of not only Liu Wu but other military governors who resented eunuch monitors' interference with them. Emperor Muzong, however, declined to do so, but at Pei's further advice ordered Liu Chengjie exiled. Only after receiving such an order did Liu Wu release Liu Chengjie back into imperial custody. Emperor Muzong subsequently gave Liu Wu the honorary title of acting Situ (司徒, one of the Three Excellencies, as Sikong was). It was said that after this incident, Liu Wu became arrogant and no longer obedient of the imperial government, often gathering bandits to serve under his command. In 823, he was further given the honorary chancellor title of Tong Zhongshu Menxia Pingzhangshi (同中書門下平章事).

Liu Wu died suddenly in 825. A final request to then-reigning Emperor Jingzong (Emperor Muzong's son) in Liu Wu's name requested that Liu Congjian be allowed to inherit the command. The officials in the imperial government argued among each other about whether Liu Wu's son Liu Congjian should be allowed to do so, but finally, with the chancellor Li Fengji and the powerful eunuch Wang Shoucheng in favor, Liu Congjian was allowed to inherit the circuit. Liu Wu was given posthumous honors.

== Notes and references ==
- Old Book of Tang, vol. 161.
- New Book of Tang, vol. 214.
- Zizhi Tongjian, vols. 241, 242, 243.
