= Li Shidao =

Chinese military general and politician

Li Shidao, or Yi Sado (Chinese: 李師道; died March 8, 819 (Note: According to Tang Xianzong's biography (vol. 15) in the Old Book of Tang, Li Shidao was executed on the 9th day of the 2nd month of the 14th year of the Yuan'he era; this date corresponds to 8 March 819 in the Julian calendar.)) was a Chinese military general and politician of the Chinese Tang dynasty, who, as the successor to his brother Li Shigu, ruled Pinglu Circuit (平盧, headquartered in modern Tai'an, Shandong) in a de facto independent manner from the imperial government. In 818, after he reneged on an offer to submit three of Pinglu's 12 prefectures to imperial control, Emperor Xianzong declared a campaign against him. In 819, his officer Liu Wu turned against him and killed him, submitting to imperial authority.

== Background ==
It is not known when Li Shidao was born. His father was Li Na, the military governor (jiedushi) of Pinglu Circuit from 784 to 792 and who had inherited the circuit from Li Shidao's grandfather Li Zhengji. His mother was a daughter of Li Zhengji's ally Li Baochen, who had ruled Chengde Circuit (成德, headquartered in modern Shijiazhuang, Hebei). He had one older half-brother, Li Shigu, who inherited the circuit after Li Na's death in 792.

It was said that during Li Shigu's rule, Li Shidao was sent out of the headquarters to govern locales, and at times he was impoverished—because Li Shigu wanted him to get experience on how life was so that he would be trained. Li Shigu later made him the prefect of Mi Prefecture. It was said that he liked painting and playing the bili.

As of 806, Li Shigu was ill, and he asked his staff members Gao Mu (高沐) and Li Gongdu (李公度) whom they planned to support as leader if he died—and when Gao and Li Gongdu did not answer quickly, Li Shigu guessed that they planned to support LI Shidao. Li Shigu tried to dissuade them—stating that while he loved Li Shidao as his brother, Li Shidao was not capable and spent his time on painting and playing bili—but did not give them any other person that he approved of. When Li Shigu died thereafter, Gao and Li Gongdu welcomed Li Shidao back to Pinglu's capital Yun Prefecture (鄆州) and supported him to succeed Li Shigu.

== Initial semi-submission to the imperial government ==
After Li Shidao took over control of the circuit, for some time, Emperor Xianzong did not issue any approvals of his takeover. When Li Shidao consulted his staff members, some suggested pillaging the nearby circuits to create pressure on the imperial government. Gao Mu earnestly opposed this, and instead proposed that Li Shidao try to receive the emperor's favor by submitting the tax revenues that Li Shigu had withheld to the imperial government, giving the imperial government the authority to commission his subordinates, and joining the imperial salt monopoly system and submitting the funds to the imperial government. Meanwhile, the chancellor Du Huangchang advocated trying to strip Li Shidao of some territory, but as Emperor Xianzong was waging a campaign against another warlord, Liu Pi, at the time, he did not want to create another battlefront. He thus made his son Li Shen (李審) the Prince of Jian the titular military governor but commissioned Li Shidao the acting military governor and, later in the year, made Li Shidao military governor officially.

In 809, there was an incident in which the great-great-grandson of the great early Tang chancellor Wei Zheng, Wei Chou (魏稠), was so impoverished that he mortgaged his ancestral home. Li Shidao offered to use his own money to pay off Wei Chou's mortgage, and Emperor Xianzong initially agreed. He had the imperial scholar Bai Juyi draft an edict approving Li Shidao's suggestion, but Bai pointed out that this is something the imperial government should do and that Emperor Xianzong should not allow Li Shidao to take credit for this. Emperor Xianzong agreed, and he used imperial treasury funds to pay off Wei's mortgage.

Also in 809, Wang Shizhen the military governor of Chengde died. Emperor Xianzong was initially willing to make Wang Shizhen's son Wang Chengzong the new military governor after Wang Chengzong offered to submit two of Chengde's six prefectures to imperial control, but after Wang Chengzong reneged on the offer, Emperor Xianzong declared a campaign against Wang Chengzong. The imperial campaign stalled, however, and Li Shidao repeatedly tried to intercede on Wang Chengzong's behalf. In 810, Emperor Xianzong ended the campaign and made Wang Chengzong military governor of Chengde.

In 812, when another ally of Li Shidao's, Tian Ji'an the military governor of Weibo Circuit (魏博, headquartered in modern Handan, Hebei), his relative Tian Xing (later known as Tian Hongzheng) took over and submitted to imperial authority. Li Shidao later threatened to, along with Wang Chengzong, attack Tian Hongzheng, but Han Hong the military governor of Xuanwu Circuit (宣武, headquartered in modern Kaifeng, Henan), who was loyal to the imperial government, threatened to attack him if he attacked Weibo, and Li Shidao did not do so.

== Alliance with Wu Yuanji ==
In 814, another ally of Li Shidao's, Wu Shaoyang the military governor of Zhangyi Circuit (彰義, headquartered in modern Zhumadian, Henan), died. When Emperor Xianzong did not commission Wu Shaoyang's son Wu Yuanji to succeed Wu Shaoyang, Wu Yuanji reacted by pillaging the nearby circuits, and Emperor Xianzong ordered a campaign against Zhangyi. Both LI Shidao and Wang Chengzong tried to intercede on Wu Yuanji's behalf, but Emperor Xianzong rebuffed them. Emperor Xianzong mobilized the troops from many circuits to attack Zhangyi, but did not request troops from Pinglu. Nevertheless, Li sent 2,000 soldiers to Shouchun (壽春, in modern Lu'an, Anhui), claiming to be joining the attack against Zhangyi, but instead trying to find a way to aid Zhangyi.

Meanwhile, some tens of assassins that Li had retained were suggesting to him that the way for him to save Zhangyi would be to use guerilla warfare—retain a group of bandits to burn the imperial food supplies around the eastern capital Luoyang such that the imperial government would be forced to concentrate on Luoyang's security and decrease the pressure on Zhangyi. Li agreed, and starting in summer 815, there were frequent bandit attacks near Luoyang—sufficiently frequent that many officials suggested to Emperor Xianzong to end the campaign against Zhangyi, but Emperor Xianzong refused.

Li's assassins then suggested the next move—assassinate the chancellor Wu Yuanheng, whom Emperor Xianzong had put in charge of the logistics of the operations against Zhangyi. Li agreed, and sent them with sufficient funds to the capital Chang'an to carry out the operation. Shortly after, Wu Yuanheng was assassinated, and the assassins also attacked another official in favor of the campaign against Wu Yuanji, Pei Du, but failed to kill Pei. Suspicions quickly fell on soldiers that Wang had sent to Chang'an as liaisons—as Wang had, shortly before, submitted a petition that attacked Wu Yuanheng bitterly. Wang's liaisons were arrested and, probably under torture, confessed to assassinating Wu Yuanheng. Emperor Xianzong thus declared Wang a renegade, while, at that point, not suspecting Li, and his assassins were able to flee Chang'an without being arrested. When some officials suggested ending the campaign against Zhangyi, Emperor Xianzong firmly refused, and further made Pei chancellor.

Meanwhile, Li was planning another attack on Luoyang. He had a detachment of Pinglu soldiers stationed at Luoyang, serving as his liaisons, and they were led by the Buddhist monk Yuanjing (圓淨), who had previously been an officer under Shi Siming during the Anshi Rebellion. They planned to burn the imperial palaces and carry out a slaughter of Luoyang's population. The plot was leaked to the imperial defender of Luoyang, Lü Yuanying (呂元膺), however, and Lü mobilized his guards and surrounded the Pinglu liaison office. The Pinglu soldiers fought their way out into the hills south of Luoyang, but later, with them pillaging the prey of the hill hunters in the region, the hunters led the imperial troops to their location, and they were mostly captured and executed. After Lü interrogated two of the Pinglu officers, Zi Jiazhen (訾嘉珍) and Men Cha (門察), he found out the extent of Li Shidao's plot and further found out that Wu Yuanheng was assassinated by assassins sent by Li, not Wang Chengzong. Lü submitted a secret petition pointing out that Li was even more treasonous than Wu Yuanji and Wang. Emperor Xianzong agreed, but as he was already waging two campaigns simultaneously against Wu and Wang, he could not declare a third one against Li at that time.

By late 815, Li was openly attacking Xu Prefecture (徐州, in modern Xuzhou, Jiangsu), belonging to neighboring Wuning Circuit (武寧, headquartered at Xu Prefecture), to try to distract the imperial forces. The Wuning officer Wang Zhixing, however, was able to defeat the Pinglu troops. After the imperial generals Li Guangyan and Wu Chongyin captured the Zhangyi outpost Lingyun Fence (陵雲柵, in modern Luohe, Henan) in fall 816, however, Li became apprehensive and submitted a petition offering to submit. Emperor Xianzong, having no ability to attack him at the moment, gave him the honorary title of acting Sikong (司空, one of the Three Excellencies).

During these anti-imperial government actions of Li Shidao's, Gao Mu, Li Gongdu, and Guo Hu (郭昈) repeatedly urged him not to act against the imperial government. Li Shidao's close associates Li Wenhui (李文會) and Li Ying (李英), however, accused Gao and Li Gongdu of being disloyal. Li Shidao eventually executed Gao and imprisoned Guo.

Li Shidao continued to be concerned about Zhangyi's viability, and he sent his officer Liu Yanping (劉晏平) to secretly head to Zhangyi to confer with Wu Yuanji. Liu had to get by the imperial lines carefully, and when he arrived at Zhangyi, Wu gave him many gifts and sent him back to Liu. When Liu returned to Pinglu, however, he reported to Li that Wu was not diligent, was wasting time in games with his wife and concubines, and was not able in military matters. Liu predicted an imminent defeat for Wu. Li, who had hoped for a more optimistic report, did not want to hear this, and he soon thereafter found an excuse to put Liu to death. As the Song dynasty historian Hu Sanxing commented:

Someone who could observe the details as Liu Yanping did must have uncommon knowledge and reason. Li Shidao could not make him a strategist and trust him to save himself, but instead killed him in anger. Of course, Li Shidao would be destroyed.

== Campaign against imperial government ==
In late 817, the imperial general Li Su captured Wu Yuanji, who was soon executed. When the news of Wu's defeat reached Li Shidao and Wang Chengzong, both became fearful. Wang again offered to surrender two of his six prefectures to imperial control and further sent his two sons to Chang'an to serve as hostages, and Emperor Xianzong accepted his submission. Li Gongdu and another officer, Li Yingtan (李英曇), thus persuaded Li Shidao to submit three of his 12 prefectures—Yi (沂州, in modern Linyi, Shandong), Mi, and Hai (海州, in modern Lianyungang, Jiangsu) to imperial control and to send his oldest son Li Hongfang (李弘方) to Chang'an as a hostage. Emperor Xianzong initially agreed, and he sent the official Li Sun (李遜) to Pinglu to comfort Li Shidao.

However, it was said that by this point, Li Shidao was only often conferring on the key matters with his wife Lady Wei, household servants Hu Weikan (胡惟堪) and Yang Ziwen (楊自溫), the female servants Ladies Pu and Yuan, and the scribe Wang Zaisheng (王再升). Lady Wei did not want to send Li Hongfang to Chang'an, and she, along with Ladies Pu and Yuan, argued that Pinglu should not weaken itself by submitting three prefectures. Instead, they argued that if he did not do so, the imperial government would, at most, attack, and that if Pinglu could try to fight and submit the three prefectures only if it was losing on the battlefield. Li Shidao agreed, and he further considered executing Li Gongdu. Only at the intercession of another staff member, Jia Zhiyan (賈直言), was Li Gongdu spared, but Li Yingtan was executed. When Li Sun arrived at Pinglu, Li Shidao promised to send Li Hongfang to Chang'an, but Li Sun could see that Li Shidao was not intending to do so. Once Li Sun returned to Chang'an and reported this to Emperor Xianzong, soon, Li Shidao submitted a petition stating that the soldiers would not permit him to submit the three prefectures and hostage. Emperor Xianzong, in anger, declared a campaign against Li Shidao, mobilizing the troops of Xuanwu, Weibo, Yicheng (義成, headquartered in modern Anyang, Henan), Wuning, and Henghai (橫海, headquartered in modern Cangzhou, Hebei) to attack Pinglu. Soon, the armies of these circuits were continuously dealing Pinglu forces defeats, and by winter 818, Tian Hongzheng's Weibo army had crossed the Yellow River and approached Pinglu's capital Yun Prefecture (鄆州). Despite these defeats, it was said that Li Shidao did not like to hear news of defeats, and when Li Su, then the military governor of Wuning, captured Jinxiang (金鄉, in modern Jining, Shandong), Li Shidao's staff members did not dare to inform him, and Li Shidao did not know about Jinxiang's fall even until his death. Meanwhile, with the soldiers clamoring for Li Wenhui to be held responsible, Li Shidao demoted Li Wenhui out of the headquarters, and he released Guo and another staff member who advocated submission to the imperial government, Li Cun (李存).

At this point, Pinglu's main forces were under the command of Liu Wu, who was known for being lenient to the soldiers and gaining their support, and stationed at Yanggu (陽穀, in modern Liaocheng, Shandong), to defend against Tian's Weibo army, but Tian was repeatedly dealing Liu defeats. Someone warned Li Shidao that Liu might be up to no good, and Li Shidao summoned Liu back to Yun Prefecture to attend a meeting, intending to execute him. However, at another person's urging, pointing out that killing Liu would lead the officers to all lose faith, Li Shidao changed his mind and, after the meeting, sent Liu back to Yanggu and gave him much rewards to calm him. Because Liu Wu's son Liu Congjian served as a guard for Li Shidao, Liu Wu nevertheless found out about Li Shidao's original thoughts and began to take precautions.

Li Shidao soon resolved again to kill Liu Wu. On March 7, 819, Li Shidao sent two messengers to Liu Wu's deputy Zhang Xian (張暹), ordering Zhang to execute Liu and take over the army. Zhang, however, was friendly with Liu, and he quickly informed Liu. Liu thus had the two messengers arrested and executed. That night, Liu informed the army the events that were occurring and stated that he was intending to make a surprise attack on Yun Prefecture and submit to imperial authority. When some officers hesitated, he executed them, and the other officers agreed to follow him. Early morning March 8, Liu made a surprise advancement toward Yun Prefecture, entering the city despite some opposition by the troops defending the city. Li Shidao's guards soon surrendered. Li Shidao hid with his two sons, but were eventually found and captured. Li Shidao still wanted to meet Liu and plead for his life, but Li Hongfang pointed out that they could not live anyway and that it was better to die quickly. Later that morning, Li Shidao and his two sons were executed by Liu.

Liu delivered the heads of Li Shidao and his two sons to Tian, and Tian soon arrived and took over control of the circuit for the imperial government. Emperor Xianzong divided Pinglu into three smaller circuits. Initially, no one dared to bury Li Shidao's body, until one Shi Yingxiu (士英秀) did so. Later, the new military governor Ma Zong (馬總) reburied Li Shidao's body with ceremony due a scholar, not a general. Li Shidao's wife Lady Wei and his youngest son were spared but made palace servants—purportedly spared only because Liu had an affair with Lady Wei and falsely reported her to be a descendant of Wei Zheng's. Li Shidao's cousins were exiled.

== Notes ==
Government offices
Preceded by Li Shigu	Governor of Qi; 806–819	Succeeded by Title dissolved
