= Li Su (Tang dynasty) =

Li Su (Chinese: 李愬; 773–821), courtesy name Yuanzhi (元直), posthumous name Duke Wu of Liang (涼武公), was a Chinese military general and politician of the Tang dynasty. He was most well-known for his surprise attack on Cai Prefecture (蔡州; in modern-day Zhumadian, Henan), then held by the warlord Wu Yuanji, successfully capturing Wu.

== Background ==
Li Su was born in 773, during the reign of Emperor Daizong. His father was Li Sheng, who would later rise to prominence as a major general during the reign of Emperor Daizong's son Emperor Dezong. When Li Su was young, on account of his father's accomplishments, he was first made Xielü Lang (協律郎), a low-level official in charge of music at the ministry of worship (太常寺, Taichang Si), and later the deputy minister of army supplies (衛尉少卿, Weiwei Shaoqing). His birth mother died early, so he was raised by another concubine of Li Sheng's, Lady Wang, who was created the Lady of Jin. When Lady Wang died, Li Sheng, because she was not his wife, did not have Li Su observe the mourning rites for a mother, but Li Su tearfully requested to be allowed to observe those rituals, and Li Sheng agreed.

After Li Sheng died in 793, Li Su and his brother Li Xian (李憲) built a tent next to Li Sheng's tomb, intending to observe the mourning period there. Emperor Dezong, believing the conditions were too harsh, ordered them to return to their own mansion, but after they went home for one night, the next day they were at the tomb again, and Emperor Dezong allowed them to continue to observe the mourning period there. After the mourning period was over, Li Su was made a member of the staff of Li Song the Crown Prince. He later served successively as the prefect of Fang (坊州, in modern Yan'an, Shaanxi) and then Jin (晉州, in modern Linfen, Shanxi) Prefectures, and was given the honorary title Jinzi Guanglu Daifu (金紫光祿大夫) on account of his virtues. He later was recalled to again serve on the Crown Prince's staff, and later served as the head of the Crown Prince's household.

== During Emperor Xianzong's reign ==
=== During the campaign against Wu Yuanji ===
It was said that Li Su was full of strategies and capable in horsemanship and archery. In 816, during the reign of Emperor Dezong's grandson Emperor Xianzong, imperial troops were conducting a campaign against the warlord Wu Yuanji, who controlled Zhangyi Circuit (彰義, headquartered in modern Zhumadian, Henan)) without imperial approval, two successive imperial generals put in command of nearby Tangsuideng Circuit (唐隨鄧, headquartered in modern Zhumadian) — Gao Xiayu (高霞寓) and Yuan Zi — had suffered defeats by Zhangyi troops. Li Su volunteered to serve in the campaign, and the chancellor Li Fengji also knew of Li Su's abilities, and therefore recommended him. Emperor Xianzong thus made Li Su the military governor (Jiedushi) of Tangsuideng Circuit, as well as the prefect of its capital Tang Prefecture (唐州), replacing Yuan.

When Li Su reached the front in spring 817, it was said that the Tangsuideng soldiers, having suffered many defeats, were fearful of war. Li Su first comforted them by stating that his intentions were not to engage in battles immediately, and further personally attended to the wounded, to try to raise the morale. He also acted as if he was not taking military discipline seriously and not taking precautions toward Zhangyi troops, in order to get Zhangyi's guards down toward him. With Li Su not being well-known and the Zhangyi troops having just defeated Gao and Yuan, Zhangyi did not take particular precautions toward Li Su.

Li Su, meanwhile, requested and received reinforcements from several circuits. He then began to carry out military actions in which he targeted Zhangyi officers, captured them, and then treated them well and incorporated them into his command structure, using their familiarity with Zhangyi's defenses against Zhangyi. Such Zhangyi officers he thus captured included Ding Shiliang (丁士良), Chen Guangqia (陳光洽), Wu Xiulin (吳秀琳), Li Xian (李憲, whose name Li Su changed to Li Zhongyi (李忠義)), and Li You. His soldiers were particularly displeased at his endearment of Li You, pointing out that Li You had killed many imperial soldiers, and further accused Li You of being an agent of Wu. Li Su, in order to calm the soldiers, delivered Li You to Chang'an, ostensibly for Emperor Xianzong to execute him — and instead sent a secret petition to Emperor Xianzong, stating that he could not succeed if Li You were executed. Emperor Xianzong thereafter pardoned Li You and delivered him back to Li Su. Li Su further abolished the former orders that those who took in Zhangyi spies would be executed — instead ordering his people that if Zhangyi spies arrived, they were to be treated with kindness. As a result, the Zhangyi spies were turned toward Li Su and informed him about the status of Zhangyi troops.

By summer 817, Li Su was formulating the strategy of making a surprise attack on Zhangyi's capital Cai Prefecture with Li You and Li Zhongyi, and he set apart 3,000 elite soldiers, calling them the Tujiang (突將), and trained them for this purpose. After a battle in which he failed in capturing Langshan (朗山, in modern Zhumadian), the Tangsuideng troops were depressed, but Li Su stated happily, "This fits within my plans." However, he could not launch his attack on Cai Prefecture at that time, with heavy rains drenching the land at that time.

In fall 817, in a battle where Li Su attacked Wufang (吳房, in modern Zhumadian), Li Su launched the attack on a day considered to be wangwang (往亡, i.e., a particular inopportune day for military action) on the Chinese calendar, against his officers' reservations, he caught the Wufang defenders unaware and quickly captured the outer city, forcing them to withdraw within the inner city. Li Su then withdrew to try to draw them out. Their commander Sun Xianzhong (孫獻忠) thereafter attacked Li Su's rear. When Li Su's own soldiers panicked, Li Su got off his horse and sat on a chair, stating, "Anyone who dares to retreat further will be beheaded." His soldiers thereafter fought back and killed Sun. When they then suggested that he attack Wufang's inner city and capture it, he responded, "That is not within my plan." He then withdrew back to his own camp.

Meanwhile, with another imperial general, Li Guangyan the military governor of Zhongwu Circuit (忠武, headquartered in modern Xuchang, Henan), frequently prevailing over Zhangyi forces, the most elite Zhangyi troops were stationed at Huiqu (洄曲, in modern Luohe, Henan), to defend against a possible Li Guangyan advancement. Li You thus suggested to Li Su that the defenses of Cai Prefecture would be particularly weakened and that the opportunity was right for an attack. Li Su reported his plan to the chancellor Pei Du, who had by this point been put in charge of the operations against Zhangyi, and Pei approved.

On November 27, 817, at dusk, Li Su launched the attack, from his then-base of Wencheng Fence (文成柵, in modern Zhumadian), without informing anyone other than Li You and Li Zhongyi what the intended target was. He had Li You and Li Zhongyi command the 3,000 Tujiang soldiers as first stage troops, with himself and the eunuch monitor of the army commanding 3,000 soldiers as the second stage troops and the officer Li Jincheng (李進誠) commanding 3,000 soldiers as the third stage troops. He attacked the village Zhangchai (張柴) and killed the Zhangyi soldiers stationed there, and then, with 500 soldiers requisitioned from Yicheng Circuit (義成, headquartered in modern Anyang, Henan) remaining there to block off potential aid troops from Langshan and Ding commanding 500 soldiers to destroy bridges between Cai Prefecture and Huiqu, he continued to advance. After the soldiers had dinner, he announced that the target was Cai Prefecture itself — drawing much alarm from the officers and causing the eunuch monitor to cry bitterly, "We have fallen into Li You's trap!" At that time, there was a heavy snowstorm, such that Li Su's banner was torn, and some of his soldiers and horses were freezing to death, but he ordered continuing march forward.

Just before dawn on November 28, Li Su's forces reached the walls of Cai Prefecture. Li You and Li Zhongyi led their soldiers in climbing up the walls, catching the wall defenders in their sleep and killing them. Li You and Li Zhongyi then entered the city and opened the gates to allow the rest of Li Su's forces in. Li Su took over Wu's headquarters and had the inner city, his mansion, where he was, surrounded. Believing that Wu's only hope was if the key Zhangyi commander Dong Chongzhi (董重質), who was in command of the forces at Huiqu, quickly advanced back to save him, he visited Dong's household and comforted Dong's family, sending Dong's son Dong Chuandao (董傳道) to Huiqu to summon him back. Dong Chongzhi immediately abandoned his troops and returned to Cai Prefecture to surrender to Li Su. Li Su had Li Jincheng attack the inner city, and by this point, the residents of Cai Prefecture were assisting Li Su's attack. On November 29, Wu surrendered, and Li Su arrested him and delivered him to Chang'an.

Several days later, Pei arrived with the Zhangyi soldiers at Huiqu, who surrendered after Wu's capture. Li Su waited by the road to be ready to pay proper respect to Pei by military ceremony. Pei initially, in humility, wanted to avoid having Li Su bow to him, but Li Su pointed out that it was proper for them to demonstrate the proper etiquette for the imperial army before the surrendered soldiers and people of Cai Prefecture. Pei thus agreed.

Li Su then returned to Wencheng Fence. His officers asked him the reasons why he was not displeased about the failure to capture Langshan, the decision not to capture Wufang, and the decision to march forward in the snowstorm. Li Su responded:

When we failed at Langshan, the enemy took us lightly and took no further precautions. If we had taken Wufang, the remaining soldiers would have fled back to Cai Prefecture and consolidated their strength, so I let them remain to divert their strength. With the snowstorm blocking their vision, no Zhangyi scouts could have raised an alarm by using a bonfire, such that Cai Prefecture would have known of my arrival. Our advance deep into enemy territory made the soldiers fear death and therefore forced them to fight doubly hard. If you have far sight, you will not care about what is near. If you made a long-term plan, you will not care about a short-term advantage. If you become arrogant in light of a small victory and depressed in light of a small defeat, you are defeating yourself, and you cannot accomplish great things.

=== After the campaign against Wu Yuanji ===
In the aftermaths of the campaign, Li Su's Tangsuideng Circuit was merged back into the circuit that it was split from — Shannan East Circuit (山南東道, headquartered in modern Xiangfan, Hubei) — and he was made the military governor of Shannan East. He was also created the Duke of Liang. At his urging, Emperor Xianzong, who had initially wanted to execute Dong Chongzhi, spared Dong but still exiled Dong to Chun Prefecture (春州, in modern Yangjiang, Guangdong) to serve as its census officer. When Li Su subsequently submitted a list of 150 officers who contributed to the victory, requesting that Emperor Xianzong promote them, Emperor Xianzong was displeased by the lengthy list, stating to Pei, "While Li Su accomplished an uncommonly great achievement, he recommended too many people. Based on this, then, imagine how many people Li Sheng and Hun Jian could have recommended!" Emperor Xianzong thus did not act on Li Su's recommendations.

Soon thereafter, with Emperor Xianzong considering a campaign on the western border against Tufan, in summer 818, he made Li Su the military governor of Fengxiang (鳳翔, headquartered in modern Baoji, Shaanxi) and Longyou (隴右, then also headquartered in modern Baoji) Circuits. Before Li Su could head to Fengxiang, however, Wu Yuanji's ally Li Shidao the military governor of Pinglu Circuit (平盧, headquartered in modern Tai'an, Shandong), who had, in fear after Wu's defeat, initially offered to surrender three of Pinglu's 12 prectures to imperial control, reneged on his offer. Emperor Xianzong, in anger, announced a campaign against Pinglu. Li Su was thereafter swapped in his posting with his brother Li Yuan (李愿) the military governor of Wuning Circuit (武寧, headquartered in modern Xuzhou, Jiangsu), which bordered Pinglu to the south, as well as the prefect of Wuning's capital Xu Prefecture (徐州). Once Li Su got to Xu Prefecture, he reorganized the troops into greater efficiency. At Li Su's request, Emperor Xianzong pardoned Dong and recalled him, and Li Su subsequently made Dong a commander in his army. Li Su subsequently engaged in 11 battles with Pinglu forces, prevailing each time. Around the new year 819, he captured the key Pinglu city of Jinxiang (金鄉, in modern Jining, Shandong), and thereafter continued to capture Pinglu cities. Li Shidao was thereafter killed by his own subordinate Liu Wu, who submitted to imperial authority.

While Li Su was still at Wuning, one of his subordinates recommended the physician Zheng Zhu to him, as he was often ill. Li Su's conditions improved after taking Zheng's medication, and he became closely associated with Zheng, such that Zheng became powerful over his staff members and were often interfering with governance. When the eunuch monitor Wang Shoucheng found the situation to be inappropriate and asked Li Su to remove Zheng from his staff, Li Su told him, "While Zheng Zhu is frivolous, he is talented. You should try to meet with him. If you really find him to be useless, I will remove him." Wang initially did not want to meet Zheng, but eventually agreed. After he did so, he was also pleased by Zheng's amusing speech, and therefore also became closely associated with Zheng. Zheng, not wanting others to know about how he first became associated with Li Su and Wang, subsequently falsely accused the officer who had initially recommended him, and Li Su executed the officer.

== During Emperor Muzong's reign ==
In spring 820, Emperor Xianzong died and was succeeded by his son Emperor Muzong. Soon thereafter, Li Su was given the honorary chancellor title of Tong Zhongshu Menxia Pingzhangshi (同中書門下平章事). Further, in anticipation of potential further actions against two other circuits governed de facto independently — Chengde (成德, headquartered in modern Shijiazhuang, Hebei) and Lulong (盧龍, headquartered in modern Beijing) — Emperor Muzong made Li Su the military governor of Zhaoyi Circuit (昭義, headquartered in modern Changzhi, Shanxi). Later that year, when Wang Chengzong the military governor of Chengde died, his brother Wang Chengyuan offered to return control of the circuit to the imperial government. Emperor Muzong, in response, moved Tian Hongzheng the military governor of Weibo Circuit (魏博, headquartered in modern Handan, Hebei) — itself having previously been semi-independent from imperial rule but which had submitted to imperial command during Tian Hongzheng's governance — to Chengde, Wang Chengyuan to Yicheng, Liu Wu from Yicheng to Zhaoyi, Li Su from Zhaoyi to Weibo, and Tian Hongzheng's son Tian Bu to Heyang Circuit (河陽, headquartered in modern Jiaozuo, Henan).

The Chengde soldiers, however, had long resented Tian Hongzheng, as during Emperor Xianzong's reign Chengde and Weibo forces had often battled each other. Initially, with Weibo soldiers accompanying Tian Hongzheng to Chengde and protecting him, they did not act, but as soon as Weibo soldiers returned to Weibo in summer 821, the Chengde officer Wang Tingcou rose in mutiny and killed Tian Hongzheng. Upon hearing of Tian Hongzheng's death, Li Su changed into mourning clothes, and he stated to his soldiers:

The reason why the people of Wei Prefecture [(魏州, Weibo's capital)] were able to receive imperial culture and have peace and happiness was Lord Tian. Now, the unlawful people of Zhen Prefecture [(鎮州, Chengde's capital)] dared to murder him because they take us lightly and think that there is no one from Wei who can avenge him. You, gentlemen, have received great grace from Lord Tian. How are you going to repay him?

The soldiers all wept in sadness. Meanwhile, Niu Yuanyi (牛元翼) the prefect of Shen Prefecture (深州, in modern Hengshui, Hebei), was not willing to follow Wang. Li Su, hearing this, sent his sword and jade belt to Niu, sending a message to him: "My father had used this sword to accomplish great things. I have also used this sword to capture Cai Prefecture. Now I give it to you, Lord, and you should use it to destroy Wang Tingcou." Niu was touched, and showed the sword and belt to his soldiers and stated, "I am willing to die for the empire." Li Su was then preparing an attack against Wang in conjunction with Niu, but suddenly fell ill again. Emperor Muzong thus made Tian Bu the military governor of Weibo to succeed him. Li Su was given the title of advisor to the Crown Prince, and allowed to return to the eastern capital Luoyang to try to recover from illness. However, he died there in winter 821. He was buried with great honors.

== Notes and references ==
- Old Book of Tang, vol. 133.
- New Book of Tang, vol. 154.
- Zizhi Tongjian, vols. 239, 240, 241, 242, 243.
