= Li Shigu =

Li Shigu (Chinese: 李師古; 778? – July 19, 806), also rendered as Yi Sago, was a Chinese military general and politician of the Tang dynasty, who, as the military governor (Jiedushi) of Pinglu Circuit (平盧, headquartered in modern Tai'an, Shandong), ruled the circuit in a de facto independent manner from the Tang imperial court.

== Background ==
Li Shigu was likely born during the reign of Emperor Daizong. His father Li Na was the military governor (Jiedushi) of Pinglu Circuit who ruled the circuit de facto independently from the imperial regime. He had one younger half-brother, Li Shidao. During Li Na's term as military governor, Li Shigu served as the prefect of Qing Prefecture (青州, in modern Weifang, Shandong), a position that Li Na himself had served while Li Shigu's grandfather Li Zhengji was military governor.

== As Jiedushi ==
In June 792, Li Na died, and the soldiers supported Li Shigu to succeed him. Later in the year, Emperor Daizong's son Emperor Dezong, then emperor, approved and made Li Shigu the new military governor. Meanwhile, Wang Wujun, the military governor of neighboring Chengde Circuit (成德, headquartered in modern Shijiazhuang, Hebei), taking Li Shigu lightly due to his youth, sent forces to De (德州, in modern Dezhou, Shandong) and Di (棣州, in modern Binzhou, Shandong) Prefectures — preparing to attack two forts that Li Na had built, Geduo and Sancha (三汊). Li Shigu sent the officer Zhao Gao (趙鎬) to defend against Wang's attack. Emperor Dezong then sent eunuchs to intervene; Wang then withdrew. Subsequently, by order of Emperor Dezong, Li Shigu tore down Sancha's walls, but thereafter often encouraged people who had offended the imperial government to join him. Meanwhile, whenever he sent staff members out for tasks, he would detain their wives and children; if any would turn against him and submit to the imperial government, he would slaughter their families, and therefore his subjects did not dare to do so. In 800, Emperor Dezong gave him the honorary chancellor designation of Tong Zhongshu Menxia Pingzhangshi (同中書門下平章事).

In 805, after Emperor Dezong's death, the imperial messengers delivering the news did not reach the circuits quickly. Meanwhile, however, Li Yuansu (李元素) the military governor of Yicheng Circuit (義成, headquartered in modern Anyang, Henan), had received a copy of Emperor Dezong's will. As he wanted to show that he did not consider Li Shigu an enemy, he secretly delivered the copy of the emperor's will to Li Shigu. Li Shigu, however, wanted to use this as an excuse to expand, and therefore declared that Li Yuansu had falsely spread rumors of the emperor's death, and prepared to attack Yicheng. However, Han Hong the military governor of another neighboring circuit, Xuanwu (宣武, headquartered in modern Kaifeng, Henan), sent stern words to Li Shigu and prepared to aid Li Yuansu. When Li Shigu subsequently received actual news of Emperor Dezong's death and succession by Emperor Dezong's son Emperor Shunzong, he was forced to withdraw back to his circuit. Emperor Shunzong subsequently sent messengers to mediate between the two circuits. Later in the year, Emperor Shunzong bestowed a greater honorary chancellor title, acting Palace Attendant, on Li Shigu. In 806, by which time Emperor Shunzong, seriously ill, had died and been succeeded by his son Emperor Xianzong, Li Shigu was given the honorary title of Palace Attendant.

Meanwhile, during Li Shigu's term as military governor, he had Li Shidao serving as a local official in various locations, and at times, Li Shidao's budget was limited. Li Shigu justified this treatment by stating that he was training Li Shidao to be frugal and understanding of the people's difficulties. When Li Shigu grew ill later in 806, Li Shidao was the prefect of Mi Prefecture. Li Shigu asked his staff members Gao Mu (高沐) and Li Gongdu (李公度) whom they planned to support as leader if he died — and when Gao and Li Gongdu did not answer quickly, Li Shigu guessed that they planned to support LI Shidao. Li Shigu tried to dissuade them — stating that while he loved Li Shidao as his brother, Li Shidao was not capable and spent his time on painting and playing bili — but did not give them any other person that he approved of. When Li Shigu died thereafter, Gao and Li Gongdu welcomed Li Shidao back to Pinglu's capital Yun Prefecture (鄆州) and supported him to succeed Li Shigu.

== Notes and references ==
- Old Book of Tang, vol. 124.
- New Book of Tang, vol. 213.
- Zizhi Tongjian, vols. 234, 235, 236, 237.

Government offices
Preceded by Li Na	Governor of Qi; 792–806	Succeeded by Li Shidao
