= Li Tongjie =

Li Tongjie (李同捷) (died June 1, 829) was a general of the Chinese Tang dynasty. After the death of his father Li Quanlüe (李全略) in 826, Li Tongjie tried to take over Henghai Circuit (橫海, headquartered in modern Cangzhou, Hebei), which his father had been the military governor (jiedushi) of, and he rejected a subsequent imperial edict for him to serve at a different circuit. A subsequent imperial campaign against him ensued, defeating him in 829. He surrendered and was executed by the imperial official Bo Qi (柏耆).

== Background ==
It is not known when Li Tongjie was born. His father Li Quanlüe was originally named Wang Rijian (王日簡), but in 822, soon after Wang Rijian was made the military governor of Henghai, then-reigning Emperor Muzong gave Wang Rijian the imperial surname of Li and the new personal name of Quanlüe. Li Tongjie thus must have been born with the surname of Wang as well, although it is not known whether the personal name of Tongjie was also a changed one. While Li Quanlüe served as military governor, Li Tongjie served as his deputy.

== Campaign against imperial forces ==
In 826, during the reign of Emperor Muzong's son Emperor Jingzong, Li Quanlüe died. Li Tongjie seized control of the circuit, and he bribed the military governors of the nearby circuits, hoping that they would intercede on his behalf so that the imperial government would agree to have him succeed his father. Initially, the imperial government took no action, and after Emperor Jingzong was assassinated around the new year 827 and was succeeded by his brother Emperor Wenzong, Li Tongjie was hopeful that the new emperor would consider letting him remain in control of Henghai. He sent his secretary Cui Congzhang (崔從長) and his brothers Li Tongzhi (李同志) and Li Tongsun (李同巽) to the capital Chang'an to pay homage to Emperor Wenzong, claiming to be willing to follow imperial orders.

In response, however, Emperor Wenzong ordered that Wu Chongyin the military governor of nearby Tianping Circuit (天平, headquartered in modern Tai'an, Shandong), himself a former military governor of Henghai, be made the military governor of Henghai. To placate Li Tongjie, Emperor Wenzong made him the military governor of Yanhai Circuit (兗海, headquartered in modern Jining, Shandong). Fearing that the military governor of the nearby circuits would encourage Li Tongjie to resist, Emperor Wenzong bestowed honorific titles on Shi Xiancheng the military governor of Weibo Circuit (魏博, headquartered in modern Handan, Hebei), Li Zaiyi the military governor of Lulong Circuit (盧龍, headquartered in modern Beijing), Kang Zhimu (康志睦) the military governor of Pinglu Circuit (平盧, headquartered in modern Weifang, Shandong), and Wang Tingcou the military governor of Chengde Circuit (成德, headquartered in modern Shijiazhuang, Hebei).

Li Tongjie refused to follow the imperial edict, claiming that the soldiers would not permit it. Emperor Wenzong ordered a general campaign against him, and ordered Wu, Wang Zhixing, Kang, Shi, and Li Zaiyi, as well as Li Ting (李聽) the military governor of Yicheng Circuit (義成, headquartered in modern Anyang, Henan) and Zhang Bo (張播) the military governor of Yiwu Circuit (義武, headquartered in modern Baoding, Hebei) to converge on Henghai. Shi considered aiding Li Tongjie, because one of his children was married to one of Li Quanlüe's children. However, after the chancellor Wei Chuhou warned Shi, and Shi's own son Shi Tang (史唐) advised against aiding Li Tongjie, Shi Xiancheng did not do so, and sent troops against Li Tongjie, commanded by Shi Tang and the officer Qi Zhishao (亓志紹). Only Wang Tingcou sought to help Li Tongjie, and while his forces did not engage imperial forces, he mobilized his forces and stationed them at his borders with Weibo, to try to distract the Weibo troops. Wang Tingcou also supplied Li Tongjie with salt and food supplies. Wang Tingcou also tried to bribe the Shatuo chieftain Zhuye Zhiyi (朱邪執宜), seeking for Zhuye to ally with him to aid Li Tongjie; Zhuye refused. Meanwhile, Wu had initial success against Henghai troops, but died in winter 827; the imperial government initially named Li Huan (李寰) the military governor of Baoyi Circuit (保義, headquartered in modern Linfen, Shanxi) to succeed Wu, but after Li Huan not only reported to the battlefield slowly but was also allowing his soldiers to pillage the countryside on the way, Emperor Wenzong instead named Fu Liangbi (傅良弼) the military governor of Xiasui Circuit (夏綏, headquartered in modern Yulin, Shaanxi), and then the imperial guard general Li You (after Fu died on the way to the front) as his replacement. The imperial generals became stalemated against Li Tongjie. Whenever they had minor victories, they exaggerated their success. To placate them, the imperial government rewarded them handsomely, and it was said that the wealth of the Yangtze River-Huai River region became drained in order to reward them.

However, the imperial troops were eventually wearing Li Tongjie down. Wang Tingcou, seeing that he was unable to save Li Tongjie by himself, persuaded Qi to turn against Shi Xiancheng and Shi Tang. Around the near year 829, Qi mutinied and headed toward Weibo's capital prefecture Wei Prefecture (魏博). Emperor Wenzong sent the official Bo Qi (柏耆) to Wei Prefecture to comfort Shi Xiancheng and the troops, and further diverted troops from Yicheng and Heyang (河陽, headquartered in modern Luoyang, Henan) Circuits to help Shi Xiancheng battle Qi Zhishao. Subsequently, Shi Tang and Li Ting joined their forces and defeated Qi Zhishao, who fled to Chengde.

In spring 829, Li You captured one of the Henghai prefectures, De Prefecture (德州, in modern Dezhou, Shandong), and the De garrison fled to Chengde. Li Tongjie, seeing that he was nearing defeat, sent letters to Li You, offering to surrender. Li You agreed to accept his surrender and reported this to the imperial government; he also sent his officer Wan Hong (萬洪) into Henghai's capital Cang Prefecture (滄州), to take over control of the city from Li Tongjie. Emperor Wenzong sent Bo to the front to comfort the troops, but Bo, believing that Li Tongjie might be planning treachery, instead rode into Cang Prefecture with several hundred cavalry soldiers. He found an excuse and executed Wan, and then seized Li Tongjie and his family members, beginning to escort them to Chang'an. On June 1, hearing rumors that Wang Tingcou was planning to launch a raid to free Li Tongjie, Bo beheaded Li Tongjie and sent his head to Chang'an. (The generals, angry that Bo appeared to be planning to claim all of the credit, submitted various accusations against Bo; further, as Li You became seriously ill soon after hearing the news of Bo's killing of Wan, Emperor Wenzong remarked, "If Li You dies, it is Bo who killed him!" Li You soon thereafter died, and Emperor Wenzong ordered Bo to commit suicide.) Li Tongjie's mother Lady Sun, his wife Lady Cui, and his son Li Yuankui (李元逵) were all delivered to Chang'an. Emperor Wenzong pardoned them, but sent them to Hunan Circuit (湖南, headquartered in modern Changsha, Hunan). Li Tongzhi and Li Tongsun, who were not born of Lady Sun, were also spared, but were exiled with their mothers. It was said that in the aftermaths of the campaign, Henghai was covered with bones, and only about 30-40% of the population remained.

== Notes and references ==
- Old Book of Tang, vol. 143.
- New Book of Tang, vol. 213
- Zizhi Tongjian, vols. 243, 244.
