= Yuan Zi =

Yuan Zi (Chinese: 袁滋) (739 – July 19, 818), courtesy name Deshen (德深), noble title Duke of Huaiyang (淮陽公), was an official and general of the Chinese Tang dynasty, serving briefly as chancellor during the reigns of Emperor Shunzong and Emperor Xianzong.

== Background ==
Yuan Zi was born in 739, during the reign of Emperor Xuanzong. His family was from Cai Prefecture (蔡州, in modern Zhumadian, Henan). It traced its ancestry from a clan of Han dynasty officials, including Yuan An (who, however, was not a direct ancestor), with direct descendance through a line of officials of Han, Cao Wei, Jin dynasty (266–420), Liu Song, Liang dynasty, Northern Zhou, Sui dynasty, and Tang dynasty. His grandfather Yuan Zhixuan (袁知玄) served as a prefectural official, while his father Yuan Chu (袁廚) served as a county magistrate.

Yuan Zi was said to be studious in his youth, and as his brother-in-law Yuan Jie (元結, note different surname) was already a prefectural prefect who had a good reputation, he lived with Yuan Jie while he studied. He interpreted the ancient works well, and Yuan Jie respected him. He later lived as a guest in the region of Jing Prefecture (荊州, in modern Jingzhou, Hubei) and Ying Prefecture (郢州, in modern Wuhan, Hubei) and taught students.

== During Emperor Dezong's reign ==
Early in the Jianzhong era (780-783) of Emperor Xuanzong's great-grandson Emperor Dezong, the official Zhao Zan (趙贊) recommended Yuan Zi as a hermit with abilities, and he was made a Xiaoshulang (校書郎), a scribe at the Palace Library. Yuan later served on the staffs of the generals Zhang Boyi (張伯儀) and He Shigan (何士幹). On one occasion, one of his subordinates was falsely accused of embezzlement, but Yuan was able to discover that the accusations were false and get him released. When the deputy chief imperial censor Wei Tao (韋縚) heard of this, he recommended Yuan to be an imperial censor with the title Shiyushi (侍御史). Yuan later served as Gongbu Yuanwailang (工部員外郎), a low-level official at the ministry of public works (工部, Gongbu).

In 794, Nanzhao, which had previously been a Tang vassal but which had been a Tufan vassal for some time, reestablished a relationship with Tang based on communications between the Tang general Wei Gao and its king Yimouxun (異牟尋), and Yimouxun offered Nanzhao's maps and local produce as tributes, and submitted the seal that Tufan's king had awarded him. Emperor Dezong sought an appropriate emissary to visit Nanzhao, and many officials found excuses to decline due to the length of the journey, but Yuan did not decline, causing Emperor Dezong to give him much praise. Emperor Dezong made him Cibu Langzhong (祠部郎中), a supervisorial official at the ministry of rites (禮部, Lǐbu), and sent him to Nanzhao as an emissary. Yuan, under Emperor Dezong's direction, bestowed a new Tang seal on Yimouxun. After his return, he was made Jianyi Daifu (諫議大夫), and then was made Shangshu You Cheng (尚書右丞), one of the secretaries general of the executive bureau of government (尚書省, Shangshu Sheng) and was put in charge of selecting officials at the ministry of civil service affairs (吏部, Lìbu, note different tone than the ministry of rites). He wrote a five-volume work, the Yunnan Ji (雲南記), about his journey.

Yuan was later made the prefect of Hua Prefecture (華州, in modern Weinan, Shaanxi), as well as the defender of Tong Pass and the commander of the Zhenguo Army (鎮國軍). His governance was said to be simple and lenient. When people came from other prefectures and wanted to settle in Hua Prefecture, Yuan gave them land and allowed them to settle. The people loved him for his mercy. However, it was also said that he did not punish people for crimes, and whenever he caught thieves, he would often release them or allow them to simply pay back what they stole. He was later recalled to Chang'an to be a general of the imperial guards, and when he was about to leave, the people of the prefecture tried to stop him on the road to prevent him from leaving. His successor Yang Yuling (楊於陵) had to publicly declare, "I, Yang Yuling, would not dare to alter the policies set by Lord Yuan." The people bowed to Yuan and allowed him to leave.

== During Emperor Shunzong and Emperor Xianzong's reigns ==
Emperor Dezong died in 805 and was succeeded by his severely ill son Emperor Shunzong. Several months later, however, with Emperor Shunzong's illness, his son and crown prince Li Chun was made regent, and Yuan Zi was made Zhongshu Shilang (中書侍郎), the deputy head of the legislative bureau (中書省, Zhongshu Sheng). He was also given the designation Tong Zhongshu Menxia Pingzhangshi (同中書門下平章事), making him a chancellor, along with Du Huangchang. Emperor Shunzong soon passed the throne to Li Chun, who took the throne as Emperor Xianzong. Yuan continued to serve as chancellor.

Soon thereafter, Wei Gao died, and his deputy Liu Pi seized control of the circuit that Wei governed, Xichuan Circuit (西川, headquartered in modern Chengdu, Sichuan), requesting to be allowed to succeed Wei. Emperor Xianzong initially refused, and he sent Yuan on a mission to try to persuade Liu to submit to a new commander, as the surveyor of Xichuan and two other neighboring circuits, Dongchuan (東川, headquartered in modern Mianyang, Sichuan) and Shannan West (山南西道, headquartered in modern Hanzhong, Shaanxi). He then made Yuan the new military governor (Jiedushi) of Xichuan Circuit and tried to summon Liu to Chang'an to serve as imperial attendant. Liu refused and prepared to resist imperial forces. Yuan, fearing Liu, did not dare to try to advance to Xichuan, and Emperor Xianzong, angry over Yuan's fear, demoted him to be the prefect of Ji Prefecture (吉州, in modern Ji'an, Jiangxi).

Soon thereafter, however, Yuan was repromoted to be the military governor of Yicheng Circuit (義成, headquartered in modern Anyang, Henan). While there, the people were so appreciate of him that, although he was still alive, built a shrine dedicated to him. He was later recalled to Chang'an to serve as the minister of census (戶部尚書, Hubu Shangshu), and later served as the military governor of Shannan East Circuit (山南東道, headquartered in modern Xiangfan, Hubei). In 814, Emperor Xianzong swapped his post with Yan Shou (嚴綬) the military governor of Jingnan Circuit (荊南, headquartered in modern Jingzhou).

As of 816, Emperor Xianzong was waging a campaign against Wu Yuanji, who ruled Zhangyi Circuit (彰義, headquartered in modern Zhumadian) in a de facto independent manner from the imperial government. Yuan, whose home Cai Prefecture was Zhangyi's capital prefecture, went to see Emperor Xianzong at Chang'an in 816, intending to persuade him to end the campaign against Wu, which was not going well at the time. On the way to Chang'an, however, he heard that the officials Xiao Mian and Qian Hui (錢徽) had been removed from their offices due to their opposition to the campaign, and he became fearful. When he reached Chang'an, instead of his originally intended advice, he instead informed Emperor Xianzong that he believed that Wu could be defeated, and Emperor Xianzong allowed him to return to Jingnan. Soon thereafter, with the commander of the forces against Wu, Gao Xiayu (高霞寓), having no success against Wu, Emperor Xianzong made Yuan the military governor of Zhangyi, briefly carving out three prefectures of Shannan East Circuit (Tang (唐州, in modern Zhumadian), Sui (隨州, in modern Suizhou, Hubei), and Deng (鄧州, in modern Nanyang, Henan)) to serve as his territory and headquartering the circuit at Tang Prefecture. Once Yuan arrived at Tang Prefecture, however, he stopped all of the scouting activities and incursions into Wu's territory, and when Wu attacked his military outpost Xinxingza (新興柵) and put it under siege, Yuan wrote Wu in abject language requesting that he lift the siege. Emperor Xianzong was displeased when he heard this, and he had Li Su replace Yuan around the new year 817. Yuan was demoted to be the prefect of Fu Prefecture (撫州, in modern Fuzhou, Jiangxi), but was soon made the governor (觀察使, Guanchashi) of Hunan Circuit (湖南, headquartered in modern Changsha, Hunan). He died in 818, while still serving at Hunan, and was given posthumous honors.

== Notes and references ==
- Old Book of Tang, vol. 185, part 2.
- New Book of Tang, vol. 151.
- Zizhi Tongjian, vols. 235, 236, 239.
