= Wu Shaoyang =

Tang Dynasty military officer (died 814)

Wu Shaoyang (simplified Chinese: 吴少阳; traditional Chinese: 吳少陽) (died September 29, 814) was a Chinese military general and politician of the Chinese Tang dynasty, who, after seizing control of Zhangyi Circuit (彰義/彰义, headquartered in modern Zhumadian, Henan) in 809, governed it in a de facto independent manner from the imperial government until his death in 814.

== Background ==
It is not known when Wu Shaoyang was born, but it is known that his family was from Cang Prefecture (滄州/沧州, in modern Cangzhou, Hebei). His father was named Wu Xiang (吳翔), and both his father and he served in the army of Weibo Circuit (魏博, headquartered in modern Handan, Hebei), when he became friendly with another Weibo soldier, Wu Shaocheng.

Sometime after Wu Shaocheng became military governor (jiedushi) of Zhaoyi Circuit in 786, he sent gold and silk to Weibo Circuit, requesting that he be allowed to have Wu Shaoyang. Weibo allowed Wu Shaoyang to report to Zhangyi. Wu Shaocheng claimed that Wu Shaoyang was a cousin and gave him various commissions; Wu Shaoyang was also given access to Wu Shaocheng's mansion. Still, because Wu Shaocheng was cruel and suspicious, Wu Shaoyang requested a position not at headquarters, and Wu Shaocheng made him the prefect of Shen Prefecture (申州, in modern Xinyang, Henan). It was said that because Wu Shaoyang was lenient, he became favored by the army. When Wu Shaocheng grew ill in 809 and fell unconscious, his servant Xianyu Xiong'er (鮮于熊兒/鲜于熊儿), forged an order in Wu Shaocheng's name recalling Wu Shaoyang to serve as deputy military governor. Wu Shaoyang put Wu Shaocheng's son Wu Yuanqing (吳元慶/吴元庆) to death and took over the circuit. After Wu Shaocheng died around the new year 810, Wu Shaoyang claimed the title of acting military governor. As then-reigning Emperor Xianzong was already waging a campaign against another warlord, Wang Chengzong, who ruled Chengde Circuit (成德, headquartered in modern Shijiazhuang, Hebei), at the time, he felt that he could not act against Wu Shaoyang as well, so he made his son Li You the Prince of Sui the titular military governor of Zhaoyi and gave Wu Shaoyang the title of acting military governor in spring 810. In spring 811, Wu was made military governor.

== As jiedushi ==
It was said that during the years he was military governor, Wu Shaoyang did not pay homage to the emperor. As his territory had many plains and meadows, he cultivated husbandry of horses and mules. He often pillaged the hills of neighboring Shou Prefecture (壽州/寿州, in modern Lu'an, Anhui), which were known for growing tea, to rob the tea merchants. He also often accepted those persons who were under prosecution by other circuits and put them into his army. However, as he often submitted tributes of horses to Emperor Xianzong, Emperor Xianzong did not act against him.

Wu Shaoyang died in 814. His son Wu Yuanji initially did not announce his death and tried to obtain imperial sanction to succeed him. When Emperor Xianzong refused to grant him a commission, Wu Yuanji reacted by pillaging the surrounding circuits, and Emperor Xianzong declared a general campaign against him, eventually defeating and killing him.

== Notes and references ==
- Old Book of Tang, vol. 145.
- New Book of Tang, vol. 214.
- Zizhi Tongjian, vols. 238, 239.
