= Princess Taihe =

Princess in the Chinese Tang dynasty

Princess Taihe (太和公主, personal name unknown), later, in 843, known as Princess Ding'an (定安公主) or Princess Anding (安定公主), was a princess of the Chinese Tang dynasty and a khatun (empress) of the Uyghur Khaganate. She was married to the Uyghur Chongde Qaghan as part of the Heqin system of marriages between Tang princesses and Uyghur qaghan, and she was later subject to the Uyghur levirate marriage system. She suffered through the Uyghur Khaganate's subsequent collapse before being welcomed back to the Tang court. As the last Tang princess to be part of the Heqin system, Taihe marked the end of the marriage alliances between the Tang dynasty and Uyghurs.

== Background and entry into marriage ==
It is not known when Princess Taihe was born, although it is known that she was a daughter of Emperor Xianzong (r. 805–820) and Emperor Xianzong's wife Consort Guo, and that she was younger than her full brother Li Heng, who was born in 795. She was Xianzong's 10th daughter over all.

Late in Emperor Xianzong's reign, the Uyghur Khaganate, ruled by Baoyi Qaghan, made repeated overtures to request a Tang princess to be married to Baoyi under the Heqin system. Eventually, after a mission headed by the Uyghur diplomat Hedagan (合達干), Emperor Muzong (r. 820–824) agreed to have Princess Taihe's older sister Princess Yong'an married to Baoyi, but as Baoyi died in 821, the marriage never took place. Soon after, Princess Yong'an requested to be ordained as a Daoist priestess, thus avoiding future marriage alliances. Baoyi was succeeded by Chongde Qaghan, who continued to seek marriage with a Tang princess, and he sent a delegation including a number of officials and two Uyghur princesses, along with a bride price of horses and camels. Later in 821, Muzong, agreed to marry Taihe to Chongde. When the Tibetan Empire, became aware of the Tang-Uyghur marriage, it attacked Fort Qingsai (青塞堡, in modern Yulin, Shaanxi), but was repelled.

== Journey to Ordu-Balik ==
On August 28, Princess Taihe departed Chang'an, the Tang capital, escorted by the general Hu Zheng (胡証), assisted by the other officials Li Xian (李憲) and Yin You (殷侑). Anticipating a possible attempt by Tibetan forces to intercept Taihe's train, Uyghur forces were dispatched to escort them as well as to attack Tibet's borders. Emperor Muzong issued an edict permitting Taihe to maintain a staff on the same level of staffing as an imperial prince.

According to Susan Whitfield, an author and Silk Road scholar, Taihe's staff travelled northward, crossed the Hexi Corridor, and made a long sweep north before turning east and south. They were back at the capital then went to Hezhong and rested there for a bit. They then headed north along the eastern side of the Yellow River.

Princess Taihe's train did not arrive at the Uyghur court until late 822. When they approached the Uyghur court, Chongde Qaghan sent a group of several hundred soldiers to welcome her and escort her to the court, but Hu Zheng declined on the basis that his mission was to escort the princess to Chongde Qaghan and therefore he had to complete that final leg of the mission. After she arrived at the Uyghur court and an appropriate date was set, Chongde gave her the title khatun—the qaghan's wife. Such weddings, as described by the Old Book of Tang, went in this manner:

The Khan first ascended a tower and sat to the east, and set up a tent under the tower for the Princess. He sent a group of Uyghur princesses to teach the Princess in the ways of the Uyghurs. The Princess took off her Tang robes and put on Uyghur robes. Accompanied by an old woman servant, she exited the tent and approached the tower from the west, bowing. The Khan sat and accepted her bow. She then bowed again and then reentered the tent. She took off her robes and put on Khatun robes, and all of her clothes were madder-colored. She also bore a gold crown with protrusions like horns. She then exited the tent and again bowed to the Khan. A large litter was set up, with a small seat in the front. A fortune teller assisted her in ascending the litter, and the chieftains of the Uyghurs' nine tribes bore the litter. They made nine right turns before stopping at the tower. The Princess then descended from the litter and ascended the tower, and she sat with the Khan in the same eastern direction. The Uyghur officials then bowed to both the Khan and the Khatun. The Khatun had her own headquarter tent, and two chancellors served her.

Before Hu Zheng and his staff were ready to depart, Princess Taihe held a feast for them, and it was said that she wept for over a day and kept them for that duration, before they actually departed. Chongde Qaghan awarded them with great treasure.

== As Khatun ==
Timeline of Taihe's Marriages
822	Married Chongde Qaghan
824	Remarried to Zhaoli Qaghan
832	Remarried to Zhangxin Qaghan
839	Remarried to Jueluowu

Chongde Qaghan died in 824 and was succeeded by his brother Zhaoli Qaghan. Princess Taihe remained in the Uyghur Khaganate, and under the Uyghurs' levirate marriage custom, she remarried to Zhaoli and eventually each of his successors. In 832, Zhaoli was assassinated by his subordinates, and his nephew Yaoluge Hu succeeded him as Zhangxin Qaghan.

In 839, after a rebellion by the officials Anyunhe (安允合) and Chaile (柴勒), Zhangxin Qaghan was able to defeat and kill them, but a subsequent attack by another official, Jueluowu (掘羅勿), along with the Shatuo chief Zhuye Chixin, defeated Zhangxin, and he committed suicide. The nobles supported another member of the royal family, as Qasar Qaghan. That year, it was said that in addition to these wars, there was a major plague and major snow storm, causing many deaths of the Uyghur's livestock and leading to the Khaganate's sudden decline.

In 840, a major Kyrgyz attack on the Uyghur Khaganate destroyed the Uyghur headquarters, and both Qasar Qaghan and Jueluowu were killed in battle. The remaining Uyghur forces scattered. In 841, one of the major generals, Wamosi, submitted to Tang (which was then ruled by Emperor Muzong's son Emperor Wuzong), and Emperor Wuzong issued an edict to Wamosi ordering him to seek out Princess Taihe. Meanwhile, Taihe was taken captive by the Kyrgyz khan Are (阿熱), and Are, who claimed ancestry from the Han dynasty general Li Ling and thus a common ancestry with Tang emperors (through Li Ling's grandfather Li Guang), treated her with respect and sent a group of generals to escort Taihe back to Tang territory. On the way, one of the remnant Uyghur leaders, Wujie Qaghan, ambushed the Kyrgyz escort and took Taihe. He had her write to Wuzong requesting that him make him the new qaghan and also lend the border city of Zhenwu (振武, in modern Hohhot, Inner Mongolia) to him to allow him to plan the rebuilding of the Uyghur Khaganate. Wuzong responded with an edict that instructed Wujie to remain outside Tang borders and requested Taihe to personally return to Chang'an to report on the Uyghur Khaganate's status.

Wujie Qaghan did not follow Emperor Wuzong's orders, and the Uyghur remnants under him pillaged the Tang's northern territory in earnest. He also made another request to borrow the border city of Tiande (天德, in modern Bayan Nur, Inner Mongolia), which Wuzong rejected. Wuzong further wrote a rebuking letter to Wujie, warning of consequences, again ordering him to have Princess Taihe personally report and make requests. Wuzong also mobilized the forces of the circuits on the northern border, preparing a major retributive campaign against Wujie. In the winter of 842, he also had the chancellor Li Deyu write a letter in his own name, addressed to Taihe, sending it to the Uyghur remnants along with winter clothes as a gift for Taihe:

Before, the Empire was willing to let go its beloved daughter to intermarry with Uyghur [nobility]. This was to seek peace for the Empire, and it was believed that the Uyghurs would assist us in quieting the borders and defend against foreign attacks. But recent Uyghur actions were thoroughly unreasonable, and its horses often headed south. Are you, Aunt, not fearful of the anger that the spirits of Emperor Gaozu and Emperor Taizong would have? As you intrude and disturb the Empire's borders, do you not think of the kindness and love of the Grand Empress Dowager [(i.e., Consort Guo)]? You, Aunt, are the mother of the state in the Uyghur Khaganate, and you should have enough power to issue orders. If the Khan does not accept your orders, then he will be ending the relationship between the two states. After that, he will no longer be able to use you, Aunt, as his defense.

In 843, Wujie Qaghan launched an attack on Zhenwu. Tang forces, commanded by the general Shi Xiong, prepared a surprise counter-attack. When he arrived near the Uyghur camp, he noticed that there were some special wagons lined with rugs, and that the servants in those wagons were wearing red- and green-colored robes that appeared to be Chinese. He sent a scout to make contact and found out that these were Princess Taihe's train. He then had the scout again inform Taihe of his plans to attack, and asked her and her servants to remain calm and not move during the attack. At night, he made a surprise attack on Wujie's tent, and Wujie's forces collapsed. Wujie fled, and Shi then escorted Taihe back to Tang territory.

== After return to Tang ==
On April 4, 843, Princess Taihe arrived at Chang'an. Emperor Wuzong ordered the chancellors and the other officials to welcome and honor her. Volume 76 of the Quan Tang Wen includes the imperial edict, which roughly translates to:

The imperial court governs through benevolence and kinship. Princess Taihe, of noble lineage and wisdom, was sent to marry the Uyghur leader decades ago to secure peace. Though treated generously, the Uyghurs grew greedy. Our loyal forces rescued her without battle. Her return brings joy to the Empress Dowager and the people. We rename her title, grant her fertile lands, and honor her sacrifice. She is hereby named Grand Princess Ding'an.

She took off her grand clothes and jewels, and she approached the palace, apologizing for the failure of her mission. Emperor Wuzong sent eunuchs to comfort her and put her robes and jewels back on, and then welcomed her into the palace. The next day, she had a reunion with her mother Grand Empress Dowager Guo, and she was made Grand Princess Ding'an (per the New Book of Tang) or Grand Princess Anding (per the Zizhi Tongjian). Seven princesses did not attend the welcoming ceremony, and Wuzong, in anger, took away a portion of their stipend and the silk customarily given to them.

== Personal preferences according to Susan Whitfield ==
In Susan Whitfield's book, Life along the Silk Road: Second Edition, published in 2015, Whitfield recounts the life of 12 individuals who lived during the period of the Silk Road. In Chapter 4, the book follow the life of Princess Taihe. Whitfield uses historical facts and her expertise to craft a narrative that encapsulates Taihe's life and relationships between different nations.

Whitfield deems it highly likely that Princess Taihe's dress, ornaments, and aesthetic preferences came from the western, distant Central Asian steppe. In her hair, she would have worn fine pins of translucent white jade from the riverbed in Khotan, ivory decorations from India, and lapis lazuli that was traded in Khotan but originated father west in Badakhshan. Her gold necklace would have had pearls and semi-precious stones representing the seven treasures of Buddhism and was fashioned by western Central Asian craftsmen.

Whitfield also discussed how Taihe's hobbies, such as music and dance, would have been influenced by the West. "Western music" was extremely popular, with several resident foreign orchestras performing at the imperial palace and other functions. Whitfield writes that just before leaving Chang'an, Taihe had started to learn the whirling dance, usually performed by Sogdian girls spinning on a small round rug. Alongside dancing, Taihe would have enjoyed Kuchean music and continued to enjoy it in the qaghan's palace, where she might have played on a gold-inlaid zither. Although she would not have been able to leave the palace often, she would have been able to explore activities outside the domestic sphere. Polo, another import from the western regions, would have allowed Taihe to develop and demonstrate her excellent horsemanship.

== Sources ==
- Old Book of Tang, vol. 195.
- New Book of Tang, vols. 83, 217, part 2.
- Zizhi Tongjian, vols. 241, 242, 246, 247.
- Quan Tang Wen, vol. 76
- Whitfield, Susan. “The Princess’s Tale: TAIHE, 821–843.” In Life along the Silk Road: Second Edition, 2nd ed., 73–89. University of California Press, 2015. http://www.jstor.org/stable/10.1525/j.ctt13x1h7w.12.
