= Zhang Zhongwu =

Chinese military general and politician

Zhang Zhongwu (Chinese: 張仲武; died 849), formally Prince Zhuang of Lanling (蘭陵莊王; per the Old Book of Tang) or Duke Zhuang of Lanling (蘭陵莊公; per the New Book of Tang), was a Chinese military general and politician of the Tang dynasty who governed Lulong Circuit (盧龍, headquartered in modern Beijing) as its military governor (jiedushi) in de facto independence from the imperial government, but who followed imperial orders in campaigns against remnants of the Uyghur Khanate, as well as Khitan, Xi, and Shiwei tribes.

== Background and seizure of Lulong Circuit ==
It is not known when Zhang Zhongwu was born, but it is known that his family was from Fanyang, the capital of Lulong Circuit, which was then in de facto independence from the imperial government. His father Zhang Guangchao (張光朝) was an officer of the Lulong army. It was said that in his youth, he studied the Zuo Zhuan version of the Spring and Autumn Annals, but at some point abandoned his studies and joined the military, eventually becoming the commander of Xiongwu Base (雄武軍, in modern Chengde, Hebei).

In 841, during the reign of Emperor Wuzong, the military governor of Lulong, Shi Yuanzhong, was killed in a mutiny. The soldiers initially supported the officer Chen Xingtai (陳行泰) as Shi's replacement, and Chen sent messengers to the imperial capital Chang'an to request commission as military governor. The lead chancellor Li Deyu believed that part of the reason why the three de facto independent circuits north of the Yellow River (Lulong, Chengde (成德, headquartered in modern Shijiazhuang, Hebei), and Weibo (魏博, headquartered in modern Handan, Hebei)) had been so disobedient to the imperial government was that the imperial government had, in the past, been too quick to confirm their military governors, and thus suggested that Emperor Wuzong wait and observe the situation further, to further create uncertainty within the Lulong army. Emperor Wuzong agreed. Soon thereafter, Chen was killed in another mutiny, and the soldiers supported Zhang Jiang (張絳) as his replacement. Zhang Jiang also sought an imperial commission, and Emperor Wuzong again failed to act, in accordance with Li Deyu's suggestion.

Meanwhile, Zhang Zhongwu sent his subordinate Wu Zhongshu (吳仲舒) to Chang'an to submit a petition on his behalf, accusing Zhang Jiang of cruelty and requesting imperial permission to attack Zhang Jiang. When Wu arrived at Chang'an, Emperor Wuzong had the chancellors question Wu further on the situation at Lulong. Wu, under Li Deyu's questioning, argued that because neither Chen nor Zhang Jiang was from the Lulong army, the Lulong soldiers did not completely support either, while Zhang Zhongwu was well-supported by the Lulong soldiers due to his father's long-standing career in the Lulong army. Wu opined that when Zhang attacked Fanyang, he would be quickly able to capture it due to the soldiers' support—and even if he failed to do so, because the food supplies for You Prefecture (幽州, i.e., Fanyang) came from the prefectures and bases to its north, Zhang Zhongwu could starve You Prefecture into submission by cutting off its supply lines. (According to Wu, Zhang Zhongwu was, at time of the petition, in his 50s, but Wu did not state which year Zhang Zhongwu was born.) Li Deyu opined that, whereas Chen and Zhang Jiang were supported by the soldiers and then requested imperial commission, and Zhang Zhongwu requested imperial commission first, it would be proper to commission Zhang Zhongwu. Emperor Wuzong agreed, and commissioned Zhang Zhongwu as the acting governor. Zhang Zhongwu was soon able to capture You Prefecture and take over the circuit. Emperor Wuzong had his granduncle Li Hong (李紘) the Prince of Fu nominally named the military governor of Lulong and commissioned Zhang Zhongwu as the deputy military governor, and created Zhang Zhongwu the Prince of Lanling or the Duke of Lanling. In spring 842, Emperor Wuzong made Zhang Zhongwu the military governor.

== As military governor ==
=== Campaign against the Uyghurs ===
At the time that Zhang Zhongwu took over Lulong Circuit, Lulong and the other circuits on Tang's northern border facing the threat of Uyghur raiders, who had headed south in the aftermaths of the collapse of their khanate due to Xiajiasi attacks. The Uyghurs splintered into many groups, and in 842, the noble Najiachuo (那頡啜) advanced on Xiongwu Base, threatening You Prefecture. Zhang Zhongwu sent his brother Zhang Zhongzhi (張仲至) with 30,000 soldiers to engage Najiachuo. Zhang Zhongzhi defeated Najiachuo, killed many Uyghurs, and accepted the surrender of some 7000 tents of people, who were subsequently distributed to the various circuits. Najiachuo fled, but was captured and killed by the leader of another Uyghur band, Wujie Khan. Meanwhile, Zhang also sent his officer Shi Gongxu (石公緒) to the Khitan and Xi tribes to kill the Uyghur emissaries to those tribes. Further, when he defeated Najiachuo, he took, as hostages, a group of Shiwei chieftains and their family members. When the Shiwei requested to ransom the hostages, Zhang refused their offered payment and stated that he would return the hostages as soon as the Shiwei also killed their Uyghur emissaries. (It is not clear how the Shiwei responded at the time.)

Later in the year, Emperor Wuzong ordered Zhang Zhongwu to rendezvous with Liu Mian (劉沔) the military governor of Hedong Circuit (河東, headquartered in modern Taiyuan, Shanxi) and the Uyghur noble Li Sizhong, who had submitted to Tang and become a Tang general, at Hedong's capital Taiyuan, to further plan a major attack against the displaced Uyghurs led by Wujie Khan. Both Zhang and Liu opined that an attack should not be made in the winter, however, and so this attack never took place.

In 843, Liu made a surprise attack, led by his officer Shi Xiong, against Wujie Khan, crushing Wujie Khan's forces and rescuing Princess Taihe, a Tang princess (Emperor Wuzong's aunt) who had married a prior khan, Chongde Khan. Wujie Khan fled, largely ending the Uyghur threat. It was said that because Zhang was angry that Liu took the credit for the victory over the Uyghurs that Zhang and Liu subsequently developed a rivalry. Later in the year, when Liu was one of the generals ordered to attack the warlord Liu Zhen, who had seized Zhaoyi Circuit (昭義, headquartered in modern Changzhi, Shanxi), the other circuits around Zhaoyi were also commissioned, but Emperor Wuzong did not request Zhang to launch his troops as well, stating instead that Zhang should watch the border for possible further Uyghur attacks.

=== After the campaign against the Uyghurs ===
Still, Emperor Wuzong was worried that the rivalry between Zhang Zhongwu and Liu Mian would interfere with the Zhaoyi campaign, and therefore (after the imperial emissary Li Hui was unable to moderate the strain between Zhang and Liu) soon transferred Liu to Yicheng Circuit (義成, headquartered in modern Anyang, Henan). The former chancellor Li Shi was made the military governor of Hedong, but soon, a mutiny led by Yang Bian (楊弁) expelled Li Shi. In the aftermaths of the mutiny against Li Shi, Emperor Wuzong considered sending Zhang to attack Yang, but Li Deyu pointed out that, due to Zhang's and Liu's rivalry, Zhang might bear a grudge against Hedong Circuit in general and might kill excessively, so Emperor Wuzong did not send Zhang. (Yang's mutiny was soon put down by Hedong soldiers under the command of the eunuch monitor of the army, Lü Yizhong (呂義忠).)

After Liu Zhen was defeated, Emperor Wuzong again urged Zhang to wipe out the Uyghur raiders, and apparently, Zhang repeatedly prevailed, causing Wujie Khan to flee further. As a result, Zhang requested that a monument be erected to commemorate the victories over the Uyghurs. Emperor Wuzong agreed, and had Li Deyu author the text.

In 845, Emperor Wuzong, a devout Taoist, ordered a general suppression of Buddhism and several other religions. Many Mount Wutai Buddhist monks fled to You Prefecture. Li Deyu, who encouraged Emperor Wuzong to suppress Buddhism, summoned Zhang's emissary at Chang'an and informed him that it would merely damage his relationship with the imperial government if he accepted the Mount Wutai monks. In response, Zhang sent two swords to his commander at Juyong Pass, ordering the commander to behead every monk who came through the pass.

In 847, by which time Emperor Wuzong had died and been succeeded by his uncle Emperor Xuānzong, Zhang was given the honorary chancellor title of Tong Zhongshu Menxia Pingzhangshi (同中書門下平章事) to reward him for his victories over the Uyghurs. Later in the year, he had a great victory over the Xi. By that point, Wujie Khan's brother and successor E'nian Khan had been dependent on the Xi chieftain Shi Shelang (石捨朗) for support, and after Zhang's victory over the Xi he could no longer do so, and so was forced to flee further to the Shiwei. In 848, apparently to try to appease Tang, E'nian Khan sent an emissary to pay homage to Emperor Xuānzong. When the emissary was returning to E'nian Khan through You Prefecture, however, Zhang ordered him to kill E'nian Khan once he arrived back at E'nian Khan's headquarters. When E'nian Khan heard this, he fled, leaving his people with the Shiwei.

In 849, Zhang died. Emperor Xuānzong allowed his son Zhang Zhifang to inherit his position, and gave him posthumous honors.

== Notes and references ==
- Old Book of Tang, vol. 180
- New Book of Tang, vol. 212.
- Zizhi Tongjian, vols. 246, 247, 248.
