= Li Deyu =

Chinese poet, politician, and writer during the Tang dynasty

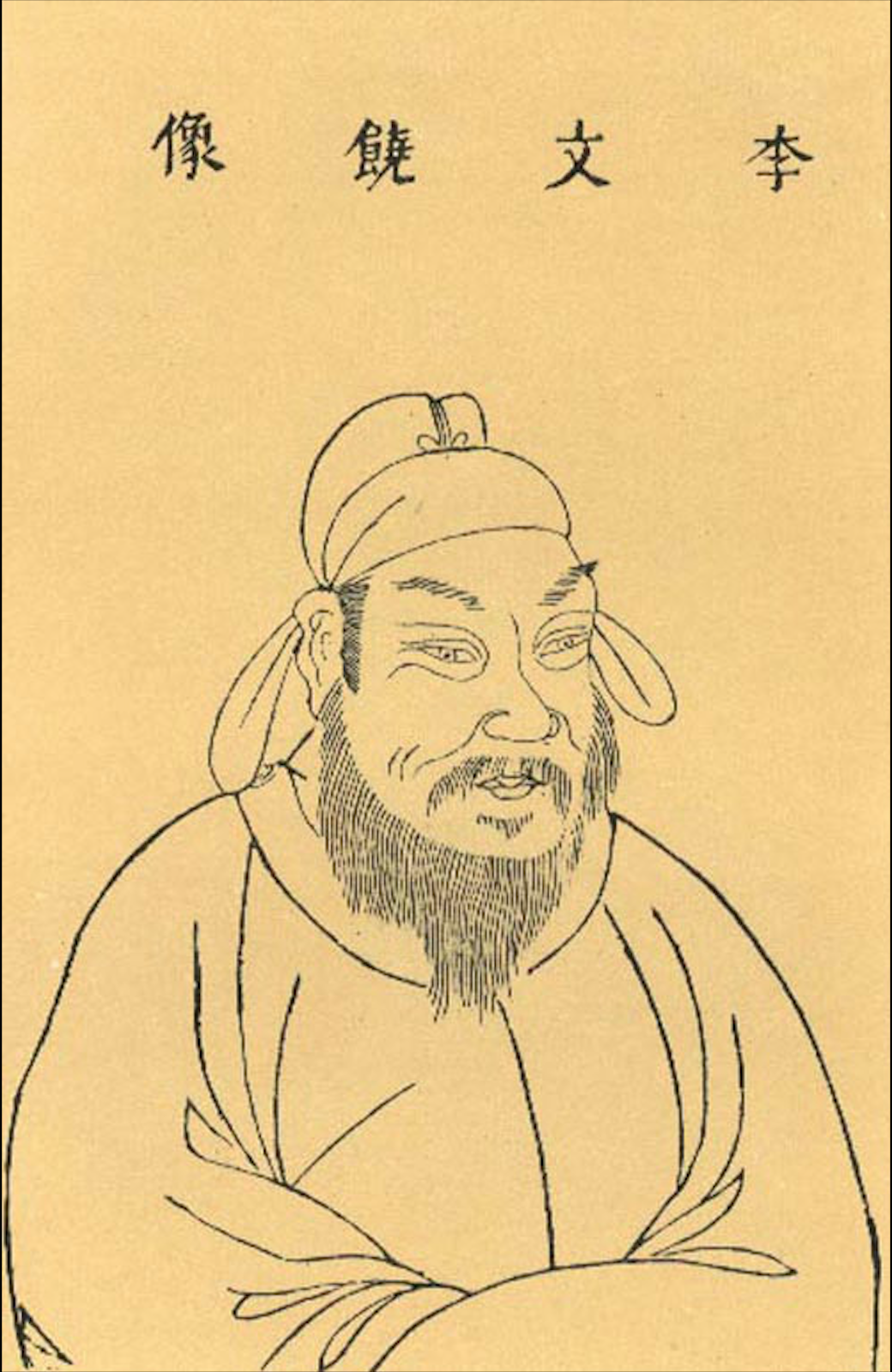
Portrait of Li Deyu

Li Deyu (Chinese: 李德裕; pinyin: Lǐ Déyù; 787 – January 26, 850), courtesy name Wenrao (文饒), formally the Duke of Wei (衛公), was a Chinese poet, politician, and writer during the Tang dynasty, serving as a chancellor during the reigns of brothers Emperor Wenzong and Emperor Wuzong and (briefly) their uncle Emperor Xuānzong. He was the leader of the so-called Li Faction in the decades-long Niu-Li Factional Struggles, and was particularly powerful during Emperor Wuzong's reign, dominating the court scene and guiding policies during the campaigns against the crumbling Uyghur Khanate and against the warlord Liu Zhen. After Emperor Wuzong's death, Emperor Xuānzong, who had long despised him for his hold on power, had him demoted and banished, where he died in exile.

== Background ==
Li Deyu was born in 787, during the reign of Emperor Dezong. His grandfather Li Qiyun (李栖筠) served as the chief imperial censor, and his father Li Jifu would eventually serve as a chancellor during the reign of Emperor Dezong's grandson Emperor Xianzong. It was said that Li Deyu was ambitious in his youth and was studious, particularly concentrating on the Book of Han and the Zuo Zhuan. However, he did not want to submit to imperial examinations. During Emperor Dezong's Zhenyuan era (785–805), when Li Jifu was in exile, Li Deyu accompanied his father and did not seek an official career.

== During Emperor Xianzong's reign ==
During the reign of Emperor Xianzong, Li Jifu became chancellor, and it was said that because Li Deyu wanted to avoid appearance of impropriety, he did not serve at the office of the imperial censors or one of the three main bureaus of the imperial government. Rather, he served on the staff of various regional governors. In 816, after the chancellor Zhang Hongjing left the chancellor post and became the military governor of Hedong Circuit (河東, headquartered in modern Taiyuan, Shanxi), Zhang invited Li Deyu to serve as a secretary. In 819, when Zhang returned to the capital Chang'an to pay homage to the emperor and subsequently remained at Chang'an, Li Deyu was made an imperial censor with the title Jiancha Yushi (監察御史).

== During Emperor Muzong's reign ==
In 820, Emperor Xianzong died and was succeeded by his son Emperor Muzong. Emperor Muzong made Li Deyu, in addition to his imperial censor position, an imperial scholar (翰林學士, Hanlin Xueshi) as well. It was said that because Emperor Muzong had long heard about Li Jifu while he was crown prince, he had respect for Li Deyu. Soon thereafter, Li Deyu was made Tuntian Yuanwailang (屯田員外郎), a low-level official at the ministry of public works (工部, Gongbu), and continued to be imperial scholar. It was said that because Li Deyu saw that at the time, the imperial relatives were becoming influential and making improper requests, he submitted a petition that requested that imperial relatives be required to meet the chancellors at the Office of the Chancellors, rather than at private homes. Li Deyu was then promoted to be Kaogong Langzhong (考功郎中), a supervisory official at the ministry of civil service affairs (吏部, Libu), and put in charge of drafting edicts.

In 821, Li Deyu was involved in an incident that was considered one of the precipitating incidents of the coming Niu-Li Factional Struggles. At that time, both Li Deyu and Yuan Zhen were involved in power struggles with Yuan's fellow Zhongshu Sheren (中書舍人, mid-level official at the legislative bureau of government (中書省, Zhongshu Sheng)) Li Zongmin, particularly since Li Deyu had long resented Li Zongmin and Niu Sengru for what appeared to be harsh criticism against Li Jifu while Li Jifu was chancellor in the third year of Yuanhe 元和 (803). Meanwhile, Li Zongmin's junior colleague at the legislative bureau, Yang Rushi (楊汝士) and the deputy minister of rites (禮部侍郎, Libu Shilang) Qian Hui (錢徽) were in charge of overseeing the imperial examinations. The military governor Duan Wenchang (a former chancellor) and the imperial scholar Li Shen both made secret pleas to Qian for certain examinees. However, when the results were announced, the examinees that Duan and Li Shen recommended were not given passing results, while among those passing the examinations were Zheng Lang, the brother of the examination bureau (門下省, Menxia Sheng) official Zheng Tan; Pei Zhuan (裴譔) the son of the military governor Pei Du (also a former chancellor); Li Zongmin's son-in-law Su Chao (蘇巢); and Yang Rushi's brother Yang Yinshi (楊殷士). This thus brought a popular uproar, and Duan submitted a report accusing Yang Rushi and Qian of being unfair. When Emperor Muzong requested opinions from the imperial scholars, Li Deyu, Yuan, and Li Shen all agreed with Duan's opinion. Emperor Muzong thus ordered Li Zongmin's colleague Wang Qi (王起) to conduct a re-examination, while demoting Qian, Li Zongmin, and Yang Rushi to be prefectural prefects and deposing 10 of the examinees selected by Qian and Yang Rushi. This was said to be the start of some 30 years of struggles between Li Deyu and his associates (known as the Li Faction) and Li Zongmin and his associates (known as the Niu Faction, named after Niu).

In 822, Li Deyu was himself made a Zhongshu Sheren, and continued to serve as imperial scholar. He was considered a possible chancellor candidate, as well as Niu. In 823, Emperor Muzong made a chancellor, while Li Deyu was sent out of Chang'an to serve as the governor (觀察使, Guanchashi) of Zhexi Circuit (浙西, headquartered in modern Zhenjiang, Jiangsu). Li Deyu believed that this was the machination by then-chancellor Li Fengji to squeeze him out so that Niu could be made chancellor, and thereafter resented Niu and Li Fengji even more.

At the time that Li Deyu was made the governor of Zhexi, Zhexi had just suffered through a plot by the officer Wang Guoqing (王國清) to overthrow Li Deyu's predecessor Dou Yizhi, and it was said that after the plot was over, Dou exhausted the circuit treasury trying to placate the soldiers. It was said that Li Deyu lived frugally, and gave the remainder of his own expense budget to the soldiers, such that while he did not give them all that much, they were satisfied, and that two years after his commission, the treasury was full again. It was also said that he sought to change the ways of the circuit's people, to eliminate customs that were harmful to them. For example, the people of the circuit were superstitious and fearful of evil spirits, such that if close family members were ill, they would abandon their family members. Li Deyu taught the knowledgeable among the people that this was undue superstition, and further punished those who abandoned family members, such that within a few years, this custom was gone. He also catalogued the various temples in the circuit—such that only those that worshipped good historical figures were allowed to remain, while he destroyed 1,010 other temples. He further destroyed 1,460 houses in the mountains so that they could not be used by bandits as operation bases.

== During Emperor Jingzong's reign ==
Emperor Muzong died in 824 and was succeeded by his son Emperor Jingzong. The young Emperor Jingzong was said to be wasteful in his living style, and later in 824 he ordered that Zhexi Circuit submit a number of silver vessels for palace use. Li Deyu petitioned that the order to set aside due to the expenses involved for the circuit. He received no response on his petition, although his subsequent petition to set aside an order for submitting silk was granted. Also in late 824, Wang Zhixing the military governor (Jiedushi) of nearby Wuning Circuit (武寧, headquartered in modern Xuzhou, Jiangsu), requested permission for him to let people take tonsure (i.e., to become Buddhist monks) at Si Prefecture (泗州, in modern Huai'an, Jiangsu), to seek divine favors for Emperor Jingzong. Emperor Jingzong initially agreed. As a result, people were rushing to Si Prefecture to take tonsure, to avoid taxes. Li Deyu submitted an objection and pointed out that if this continued, Zhexi and its Zhedong (浙東, headquartered in modern Shaoxing, Zhejiang) and Fujian (福建, headquartered in modern Fuzhou, Fujian) would lose some 600,000 battle-capable young men, Emperor Jingzong ordered a stop to the practice.

In 825, Li Deyu submitted a six-part petition urging Emperor Jingzong to change his ways entitled the Six Maxims of the Red Screen (丹扆六箴), written in six poems with 12 four-character lines each, pointing out the emperor's inappropriate behavior in six areas and hoping that he would change:

- That he was late to meetings with imperial officials and did not hold them often enough.
- That he was wearing inappropriate clothing.
- That he was requesting too many tributes.
- That he was taking honest counsel lightly.
- That he was close to scoundrels.
- That he was seeking for pleasures in too many places.

Emperor Jingzong issued an edict thanking and praising Li Deyu. It was said that Li Deyu hoped that this would catch Emperor Jingzong's attention and recall him to Chang'an, but Li Fengji, who was still chancellor, prevented that possibility.

== During Emperor Wenzong's reign ==
=== Prior to chancellorship ===
Around new year 827, Emperor Jingzong was assassinated and succeeded by his younger brother Emperor Wenzong. In 829, Emperor Wenzong recalled Li Deyu to Chang'an and made him deputy minister of defense (兵部侍郎, Bingbu Shilang). The senior chancellor Pei Du recommended Li Deyu to Emperor Wenzong to be chancellor, but Li Zongmin, who was then deputy minister of civil service affairs, was named chancellor over Li Deyu due to assistance of eunuchs. Thereafter, because Li Zongmin viewed Li Deyu as a threat, Li Deyu was sent out of Chang'an again to serve as the military governor of Yicheng Circuit (義成, headquartered in modern Anyang, Henan). Subsequently, under Li Zongmin's recommendation, Niu, who was the military governor of Wuchang Circuit (武昌, headquartered in modern Wuhan, Hubei) at that point, was recalled to be chancellor in 830, and it was said that Li Zongmin and Niu worked together to eject Li Deyu's allies out of Chang'an; even Pei was sent out of Chang'an to serve as the military governor of Shannan East Circuit (山南東道, headquartered in modern Xiangfan, Hubei).

Later in 830, Li Deyu was moved from Yicheng to Xichuan Circuit (西川, headquartered in modern Chengdu, Sichuan), which had recently suffered from a Nanzhao incursion in 829 and was said to be weak in its defenses. Upon Li Deyu's arrival in Xichuan, he consulted with many old soldiers and officers of Xichuan to quickly familiarize himself with the fronts with Nanzhao and Tufan. He also sought reinforcements, pointing out that Xichuan's forces had been severely weakened. After his requests were granted, Li Deyu also trained the soldiers, built up the defenses of the border forts, and stored emergency food supplies, and it was said that the people of Xichuan, who were previously fearful of another Nanzhao invasion, were pacified.

In 831, Li Deyu sent messengers to Nanzhao to request that Nanzhao return some of the Xichuan people whom Nanzhao had seized during the 829 invasion, and Nanzhao returned 4,000 people.

Late in 831, Li Deyu reported that Xidamou (悉怛謀), the Tufan officer in charge of Wei Prefecture (維州, in modern Ngawa Tibetan and Qiang Autonomous Prefecture, Sichuan), surrendered Wei Prefecture, which Tufan had captured from Tang decades earlier, to him. Li Deyu advocated accepting the surrender and using Wei Prefecture as a launch pad for a major campaign against Tufan. Niu opposed, arguing that this was a violation of the peace treaty between Tang and Tufan and that, should a war start, Tufan forces could reach Chang'an easily. Emperor Wenzong accepted his argument and ordered that Li Deyu return Wei Prefecture, as well as Xidamou and his soldiers, to Tufan. Tufan had Xidamou and his soldiers massacred. The massacre brought much popular sentiment against Niu, and was commonly viewed at the time to be the result of the conflict between Niu/Li Zongmin and Li Deyu. It was said that this incident caused Li Deyu to resent Niu even more.

In 832, with Emperor Wenzong regretting his decision in the Xidamou matter, Niu resigned and was made the military governor of Huainan Circuit (淮南, headquartered in modern Yangzhou, Jiangsu). Li Deyu was recalled to Chang'an to serve as minister of defense (兵部尚書, Bingbu Shangshu) and was expected by popular sentiment to be chancellor next. This caused Li Zongmin much apprehension, and he, under the advice of Du Cong, was initially trying to broker a peace with Li Deyu by recommending Li Deyu to be chief imperial censor (御史大夫, Yushi Daifu). However, Li Zongmin subsequently changed his mind under opposition by another associate, Yang Yuqing (楊虞卿).

=== Chancellorship ===
In 833, Li Deyu was made chancellor de facto with the designation Tong Zhongshu Menxia Pingzhangshi (同中書門下平章事). When he met with Emperor Wenzong to thank Emperor Wenzong, Emperor Wenzong discussed with him the matter of partisanship within the imperial government, and Li Deyu, seeing that Emperor Wenzong disliked partisanship, opined that one third of the imperial officials were engaging in partisanship—and then proceeded to use Emperor Wenzong's dislike of partisanship to eject people he disliked from the government, including Yan Yuqing and Yang's associates Zhang Yuanfu (張元夫) and Xiao Huan (蕭澣). He was also soon butting heads with Li Zongmin on a number of matters, such as Yang's demotion and Li Zongmin's public derogation of the talents of Zheng Tan and Yin You (殷侑). Later in the year, Li Zongmin was sent out of the capital to serve as the military governor of Shannan West Circuit (山南西道).

Also in 833, when Yang Yuanqing (楊元卿) the military governor of Xuanwu Circuit (宣武, headquartered in modern Kaifeng, Henan) was ill and discussion was made regarding Yang's successor, Li Deyu suggested moving Liu Congjian the military governor of Zhaoyi Circuit (昭義, headquartered in modern Changzhi, Shanxi), to Xuanwu—as the Liu family had been entrenched at Zhaoyi since Liu's father Liu Wu, to eliminate the entrenchment. Emperor Wenzong, believing that it was not yet time to confront Liu Congjian, did not follow Li Deyu's suggestion and instead made former chancellor Li Cheng the military governor of Xuanwu. Meanwhile, at Li Deyu's suggestion, Emperor Wenzong issued a decree that, in addition to creating his son Li Yong crown prince, also ordered that the imperial princes (who had been restricted to living inside the palace complex since the time of Emperor Xuanzong) be allowed to live outside the palace and be given commissions as local officials; that their daughters be married in a prompt manner; and that the imperial examinations no longer test on poetry. (However, the imperial princes' moving out of the palace complex was not implemented due to a dispute over what kind of commissions they would receive.)

However, as of 834, Li Deyu began to incur Emperor Wenzong's displeasure by opposing commissions for Emperor Wenzong's close associate Li Zhongyan, which also offended another associate of Emperor Wenzong's, Zheng Zhu, as well as the eunuch Wang Shoucheng, who had recommended Zheng and Li Zhongyan to Emperor Wenzong. Wang, Zheng, and Li Zhongyan, in order to fight against Li Deyu, had Li Zongmin recalled from Shannan West to again serve as chancellor. Soon thereafter, Li Deyu was himself commissioned to be the military governor of Shannan West, continuing to carry the Tong Zhongshu Menxia Pingzhangshi title as an honorary title. Li Deyu then met with Emperor Wenzong and requested to stay at Chang'an. Initially, Emperor Wenzong agreed, and allowed him to remain at Chang'an to serve as the minister of defense. However, after Li Zongmin objected that this should not be a matter up for Li Deyu to decide, Emperor Wenzong sent Li Deyu out to Zhenghai Circuit (i.e., Zhexi) to serve as military governor, and further did not allow him to retain the Tong Zhongshu Menxia Pingzhangshi title.

=== After chancellorship ===
However, Zheng Zhu continued to attack Li Deyu. In 835, Zheng's associates Wang Fan (王璠) and Li Han (李漢) accused Li Deyu of associating with Du Zhongyang (杜仲陽) the wet nurse of Emperor Wenzong's brother Li Cou, formerly the Prince of Zhang (who had, by this point been demoted to be the Duke of Chao County), in order to support Li Cou against Emperor Wenzong. Emperor Wenzong, in anger, summoned a meeting with the chancellors, Zheng, Wang, and Li Han. Li Deyu's colleague as chancellor, Lu Sui, spoke in his defense, so initially, the only consequence that Li Deyu suffered was that he was made Taizi Binke (太子賓客), a member of Li Yong's staff—but sent to have his office at the eastern capital Luoyang, making the title entirely honorary. Subsequently, Lu was himself stripped of his chancellor title and made the military governor of Zhenghai on account of his defending Li Deyu. After Lu's demotion, Li Deyu was further demoted to be the secretary general of Yuan Prefecture (袁州, in modern Yichun, Jiangxi), on charges that he did not visit Emperor Wenzong when Emperor Wenzong was ill and that his tax collection at Xichuan caused the people trouble. When, subsequently, Li Zongmin also incurred Emperor Wenzong's wrath and was exiled as well, Zheng and Li Zhongyan (whose name had been changed to Li Xun at this point) were able to use the opportunity to accuse any imperial official they disliked of being an associate of Li Zongmin or Li Deyu, and those accused were often exiled or demoted.

Late in 835, a plot by Emperor Wenzong, Zheng, and Li Xun to slaughter the powerful eunuchs (later known as the Ganlu Incident) failed, leading to the eunuchs' slaughtering of the imperial officials, including Zheng, Li Xun (who had been made a chancellor by that point), and Li Xun's fellow chancellors Wang Ya, Jia Su, and Shu Yuanyu. After the failure of the plot, in spring 836, Li Deyu was slightly promoted, to be the prefect of Chu Prefecture (滁洲, in modern Chuzhou, Anhui), and it was said that those officials previously exiled or demoted on account of being Li Zongmin's or Li Deyu's associates were beginning to be promoted as well. Soon thereafter, Li Deyu himself was again made the governor of Zhexi.

In 837, Li Deyu was made the deputy military governor of Huainan, to act as military governor, replacing Niu Sengru. When Niu heard that Li Deyu was to succeed him, he entrusted the matters to his deputy Zhang Lu (張鷺) and immediately left the circuit. When Li Deyu arrived, he submitted a report stating that the circuit treasury had only half as much as the wealth as Niu reported, and that Zhang had spent half of the wealth in Niu's absence. Niu submitted a petition defending himself and Zhang and requested that Li Deyu be ordered to recount the treasury reserves. After the recount, Niu's report was deemed correct. Li Deyu submitted an apology, stating that he was ill when first arriving at Huainan and had been lied to by his subordinates, requesting punishment. Emperor Wenzong did not punish Li Deyu, however.

While at Huainan, there was a time when the eunuch monitor of the circuit, Yang Qinyi (楊欽義), was recalled to Chang'an, and there was expectation that he would become one of the directors of palace communications—one of the highest possible positions for a eunuch. Li Deyu, while not publicly showing deference to Yang, invited Yang to a feast and gave him great amounts of treasure as gifts. However, when Yang reached Bian Prefecture (汴州, in modern Kaifeng), Emperor Wenzong changed his order and had him return to Huainan. When Yang returned to Huainan, he, distressed, returned the gifts to Li Deyu, but Li Deyu responded, "These are not worth much," and had Yang keep the gifts, thus establishing a strong relationship with Yang.

== During Emperor Wuzong's reign ==
=== Before the Uyghur campaign ===
In 840, Emperor Wenzong died and was succeeded by his younger brother, Emperor Wuzong—who was not the choice of Emperor Wenzong (who wanted their nephew Li Chengmei to succeed him) or the chancellors Yang Sifu (whom Emperor Wuzong later believed had supported another brother of his, Li Rong the Prince of An) and Li Jue (whom Emperor Wuzong later believed had supported Li Chengmei), both of whom were considered Niu Faction leaders by later historians—but was chosen by the powerful eunuchs Qiu Shiliang and Yu Hongzhi (魚弘志). As Emperor Wuzong did not trust Yang or Li Jue, he removed them from their chancellor posts, and, as Yang Qinyi had recommended Li Deyu, he decided to recall Li Deyu from Huainan to serve as chancellor.

Upon Li Deyu's arrival in Chang'an, Emperor Wuzong made him Menxia Shilang (門下侍郎), the deputy head of the examination bureau, and chancellor again with the designation Tong Zhongshu Menxia Pingzhangshi. When meeting Emperor Wuzong to thank him, Li Deyu emphasized the importance of entrusting the chancellors with the affairs of state, as well as openness between the emperor and his officials, both points that Emperor Wuzong agreed with.

Soon after Li Deyu became chancellor again, officials considered Yang Sifu's associates, such as Pei Yizhi (裴夷直) and Li Zhongmin (李中敏) were ejected from the imperial government. Nevertheless, in 841, when Emperor Wuzong, still resentful over how Yang and Li Jue did not support him, sent eunuchs to order Yang and Li Jue to commit suicide, with Du Cong pointing out to Li Deyu that he should not encourage Emperor Wuzong to be in the mode of killing officials, Li Deyu, along with fellow chancellors Cui Gong, Cui Dan, and Chen Yixing, interceded on Yang's and Li Jue's behalf, and after much pleading from them, Yang, Li Jue, as well as Pei, were further demoted, but spared of their lives.

=== The Uyghur campaign ===
Meanwhile, in 840, Yaoluoge Hesa (藥羅葛闔馺) and Jueluowu (掘羅勿), the khan and chancellor of Tang's ally the Uyghur Empire, were killed in a major Xiajiasi attack, and the remaining Uyghur forces were thrown into a state of confusion. In the confusion, one group of Uyghur nobles supported Yaoluoge Wuxi (藥羅葛烏希) as the new khan (as Wujie Khan), while Yaoluoge Hesa's brother Wamosi took another group of Uyghur nobles to the border city of Tiande (天德, in modern Bayan Nur, Inner Mongolia) and offered to submit to Tang. In 841, Tiande's commander Tian Mou (田牟) and eunuch monitor Wei Zhongping (韋仲平), wanting to be credited with victories, suggested not to accept the surrender—arguing that Wamosi was a traitor as far as Wujie Khan was concerned—and to attack. Li Deyu pointed out that Wamosi was no traitor—as he offered to submit before Wujie Khan had even claimed khan title—and that based on the prior Tang–Uyghur alliance, displaced Uyghurs, such as the people under Wamosi's command, should be accepted. Emperor Wuzong agreed and accepted Wamosi's submission.

Wamosi subsequently requested emergency food relief for the Uyghurs, which Li Deyu suggested that Emperor Wuzong accept. At a subsequent meeting called by Emperor Wenzong, Chen Yixing vehemently opposed, arguing that this would be, in effect, aiding the enemy. Li Deyu pointed out regardless of whether Wamosi remained submissive, his people would have to be fed—or otherwise, with Tang forces not ready for combat at that point, Tiande would fall under an attack. Chen did not dare to oppose further, and Emperor Wuzong approved the sending of emergency food supplies to Wamosi's people. Also under Li Deyu's advice, Emperor Wuzong issued an edict to Wamosi asking him to seek out and return Emperor Xianzong's daughter (and thus, Emperor Wuzong's aunt) Princess Taihe, whom Emperor Muzong had married to a prior khan, Chongde Khan, as part of a heqin (marriage alliance) marriage, whom Emperor Wuzong's court had lost contact with since the crushing defeat that Xiajiasi forces inflicted against the Uyghurs. (Unknown to Emperor Wuzong (and Li Deyu) at this point, Princess Taihe had initially been captured by Xiajiasi's khan Are (阿熱), who claimed to be distantly related to Tang's imperial Li clan and who treated her with respect. Are sent a convoy to escort her back to Tang territory, but the convoy was intercepted and destroyed by Wujie Khan, who subsequently took Princess Taihe hostage.)

Meanwhile, one of the circuits on the Uyghur border—Lulong Circuit (盧龍, headquartered in modern Beijing), which had long been only nominally under imperial control—was going through internal turmoils of its own, as early in 841, there had been a mutiny that killed the military governor Shi Yuanzhong. The soldiers initially supported the officer Chen Xingtai (陳行泰) to take over the circuit. Emperor Wuzong, under Li Deyu's advice, declined to take immediate action on petitions submitted on Chen's behalf for Chen to become military governor. Soon thereafter, Chen himself was assassinated, and the soldiers supported another officer, Zhang Jiang (張絳) to be their leader. Emperor Wuzong similarly declined to act on petitions on Zhang's behalf. Thereafter, when Lulong officer Zhang Zhongwu, who was then the commander of Xiongwu Base (雄武軍, in modern Chengde, Hebei), requested imperial commission and permission to attack Zhang Jiang, Emperor Wuzong, again under Li Deyu's advice, agreed, and Zhang Zhongwu soon captured Lulong's capital You Prefecture (幽州) and took over the circuit.

Also in 841, when a flood damaged Xiang Prefecture (襄州), the capital of Shannan East Circuit, which Niu Sengru was then the military governor of, Li Deyu used the opportunity to blame the destruction on Niu and had him stripped of his authorities. In spring 842, there was another event that the later Song dynasty historian Hu Sanxing pointed out showed the partisan side of Li Deyu. The official Liu Gongquan was friendly with Li Deyu, but when Cui Gong recommended Liu to be an imperial scholar to be in charge of Jixian Institute (集賢院), Li Deyu was displeased because this recommendation was not made by him. He therefore found an excuse to have Liu made Taizi Zhanshi (太子詹事)—an entirely honorary post with no authorities.

Also in 842, at Li Deyu's advice, Emperor Wuzong ordered Tian to stop engaging the Uyghur irregulars, but instead entice them with food supplies and send them to Hedong Circuit (河東, headquartered in modern Taiyuan, Shanxi) (so that they would not remain at Tiande and be disruptive). Also under Li Deyu's recommendation, the general Shi Xiong was sent to Tiande to assist Tian in defending against Uyghur raids.

Meanwhile, Qiu had become very jealous of Li Deyu's hold on power as well. When Emperor Wuzong was planning to issue a general pardon, rumors got to Qiu that, as part of the edict, the chancellors and the director of finances were planning to reduce Shence Army's clothing and food stipends, Qiu publicly declared, "If this occurred, when the pardon is declared, the soldiers will gather in front of Danfeng Tower [(丹鳳樓, the tower from which emperors declared pardons)] and demonstrate!" Emperor Wuzong, angered by the remarks, sent eunuchs to rebuke Qiu and the other Shence Army officers for spreading rumors, and Qiu apologized.

By summer 842, Wujie Khan was openly attacking Tang border regions. Emperor Wuzong put Li Deyu in charge of drafting various rebukes against Wujie Khan and his advisors, urging them to reconsider their attacks. Also, with Wujie Khan forcing Princess Taihe to submit requests to allow the Uyghurs to borrow Tiande as an operation base, Emperor Wuzong had Li Deyu write her a response back, stating:

Before, the Empire was willing to let go its beloved daughter to intermarry with the Huihu [Uyghurs]. This was to seek peace for the Empire, and it was believed that Huihu would assist us in quieting the borders and defend against foreign attacks. But recent Huihu actions were thoroughly unreasonable, and its horses often headed south. Are you, Aunt, not fearful of the anger that the spirits of Emperor Gaozu and Emperor Taizong would have? As you intrude and disturb the Empire's borders, do you not think of the kindness and love of the Grand Empress Dowager [(i.e., Emperor Wuzong's grandmother and Princess Taihe's mother Grand Empress Dowager Guo)]? You, Aunt, are the mother of the state in Huihu, and you should have enough power to issue orders. If the Khan does not accept your orders, then he will be ending the relationship between the two states. After that, he will no longer be able to use you, Aunt, as his defense.

Under Li Deyu's advice, Emperor Wuzong subsequently sent Wamosi (who had by this point been granted the Tang imperial name of Li Sizhong) and the general Li Zhongshun (李忠順) to the border to fight against Wujie Khan. Meanwhile, in a surprise attack, in spring 843, Shi inflicted great losses on Wujie Khan's forces and rescued Princess Taihe, after which Wujie Khan fled and would no longer be a threat to Tang. Subsequently, when Emperor Wuzong considered asking Xiajiasi to return Anxi (安西, formerly headquartered in modern Aksu Prefecture, Xinjiang) and Beiting (北庭, formerly headquartered in modern Changji Hui Autonomous Prefecture, Xinjiang) Circuits—which were formerly under Tang control but which had been lost for decades—Li Deyu opposed, pointing out that it would be a logistical nightmare to place garrisons at Anxi and Beiting and supply them. Emperor Wuzong agreed.

With the Uyghur campaign over, Li Deyu sought to revisit the Xidamou incident, which had occurred 12 years earlier—submitting a petition that painted Niu as jealous of him and causing a great injustice, and also arguing that Wei Prefecture would have served as a forward attack point against Tufan. At Li Deyu's urging, Emperor Wuzong posthumously honored Xidamou as a general. (It was believed by the modern historian Zhu Gui (朱桂) that Li Deyu was intending to use the revisiting of the Xidamou incident to carry out his vengeance against Niu and Li Zongmin, but that subsequent events—the Zhaoyi campaign—gave Li Deyu even greater ammunition.)

=== The Zhaoyi campaign ===
==== Events of 843 ====
In summer 843, Liu Congjian was growing ill, and he wanted his adoptive son and biological nephew Liu Zhen to succeed him as the military governor of Zhaoyi. Liu Congjian soon died, but Liu Zhen did not announce his death and had petitions written in Liu Congjian's name requesting that Liu Zhen be made military governor. The chancellors largely believed that a campaign against Zhaoyi would be difficult to wage and therefore suggested that the request be granted. Li Deyu, however, argued that Zhaoyi, unlike Lulong and two other circuits north of the Yellow River—Weibo (魏博, headquartered in modern Handan, Hebei) and Chengde (成德, headquartered in modern Shijiazhuang, Hebei)—did not have a tradition of defying the imperial government, and therefore suggested that Liu Congjian's petition be denied, pointing out that allowing the Liu family to continue to hold Zhaoyi would cause other military governors to want to follow suit. He further suggested that, in order to make sure that Weibo's military governor He Hongjing and Chengde's military governor Wang Yuankui would not assist Liu Zhen, explicit promises be made to He Hongjing and Wang that their circuits would not be interfered with, and that they would be responsible for capturing three of Zhaoyi's five prefectures east of the Taihang Mountains, thus making sure that imperial forces would not operate close to Weibo or Chengde. Emperor Wuzong agreed, and imperial messengers were dispatched to Weibo and Chengde; He Hongjing and Wang agreed to follow imperial orders. (Meanwhile, Li Deyu used the opportunity to strike at Li Zongmin—by accusing Li Zongmin of being an associate of Liu Congjian's—and had Li Zongmin sent out of Luoyang to be the prefect of Hu Prefecture (湖州, in modern Huzhou, Zhejiang).

After Liu Zhen finally announced Liu Congjian's death, Emperor Wuzong publicly posthumously honored Liu Congjian, but ordered that Liu Zhen escort Liu Congjian's casket to Luoyang, and further met with Liu Zhen's biological father Liu Congsu (劉從素), telling him to persuade Liu Zhen to accept the order. Liu Zhen refused, and Emperor Wuzong ordered a general campaign against Zhaoyi. At Li Deyu's suggestion, the military governors were ordered to have specific targets to capture within Zhaoyi (to prevent them from waging minor battles and then sitting on the front without truly engaging Zhaoyi forces)—with Wang targeting Xing Prefecture (邢州, in modern Xingtai, Hebei), He Hongjing targeting Ming Prefecture (洺州, in modern Handan), Wang Maoyuan (王茂元) the military governor of Heyang Circuit (河陽, headquartered in modern Jiaozuo, Henan) targeting Ze Prefecture (澤州, in modern Jincheng, Shanxi), and LI Yanzuo (李彥佐) the military governor of Wuning Circuit and Liu Mian (劉沔) the military governor of Hedong Circuit targeting Zhaoyi's capital Lu Prefecture (潞州). When Li Yanzuo subsequently delayed on the way to the front, at Li Deyu's advice, Emperor Wuzong issued harshly worded edicts to push him to proceed, and also made Shi Xiong his deputy to eventually have Shi take over Li Yanzuo's troops. Soon, Shi took over Li Yanzuo's troops and immediately launched attacks against Zhaoyi.

Meanwhile, Wang Yuankui and He Hongjing, on Zhaoyi's eastern front, were having disagreements, with Wang secretly accusing that He Hongjing was purposefully delaying attacks on Zhaoyi. At Li Deyu's suggestion, Emperor Wuzong had Wang Zai the military governor of Zhongwu Circuit (忠武, headquartered in modern Xuchang, Henan) lead additional troops to attack Zhaoyi's eastern prefectures—which would take Zhongwu troops through Weibo. This surprised He Hongjing, who thus felt pressured to attack Zhaoyi, and he finally launched his troops. As soon as He Hongjing launched his troops, Wang Zai's orders were then changed to aid Heyang Circuit, which Liu Zhen was attacking in an effort to force the imperial government into a truce and which Wang Maoyuan could not protect due to his own illness. After Wang Maoyuan died thereafter, at Li Deyu's suggestion, Emperor Wuzong put the Heyang troops under Wang Zai's command as well, but did not make him the military governor of Heyang.

While the campaign was going on, there was a Dangxiang uprising, which attacked Yan Prefecture (鹽州, in modern Yulin, Shaanxi). Li Deyu pointed out that the nomadic Dangxiang were roving pillagers who were not taken seriously by border officials because the border officials wanted to acquire camels and horses from them, and suggested that a command structure be imposed over the six circuits where the Dangxiang resided, with an imperial prince in nominal command. Emperor Wuzong agreed and nominally made his son Li Qi (李岐) the Prince of Yan be the supreme commander of the six circuits and chief comforter of the Dangxiang, and made the official Li Hui Li Qi's deputy, in actual supervision of the Dangxiang situation.

With Wang Zai getting victories over Zhaoyi forces (but unable to capture Ze Prefecture immediately), Liu Zhen had a letter from Li Tian (李恬) the prefect of Ming Prefecture, a cousin to Li Shi, a former chancellor who was by this point the military governor of Hedong, sent to Li Shi, suggesting that Liu was willing to surrender. Li Deyu suggested, and Emperor Wuzong agreed, that no action be taken on the offer immediately, and ordered Li Shi reply in a harsh manner, indicating that surrender would only be accepted if Liu and his family members had themselves bound and taken to the border between Zhaoyi and Hedong; only then would Li Shi agree to escort them to Chang'an.

==== Events of 844 ====
Meanwhile, the Hedong forces, under the command of the officer Wang Feng (王逢), were stationed at Yushe (榆社, in modern Jinzhong, Shanxi), and Wang sought reinforcements. Hedong headquarters, however, were out of troops, so Li Shi summoned 1,500 soldiers from the northern front, that Liu Mian had previously placed at Hengshui Fence (橫水柵, in modern Datong, Shanxi) during the Uyghur campaign, under the command of the officer Yang Bian (楊弁), back to Taiyuan, so that he could send them to reinforce Wang. Three days before the Chinese New Year, the Hengshui Fence soldiers arrived, but as the circuit treasury was empty, Li Shi could not give them the silk rewards that the soldiers being sent on a campaign were accustomed to receive; rather, he had to take silk out of his own personal wealth, but was only able to pay half as much. Further, the eunuch monitor Lü Yizhong (呂義忠), then with Wang, was sending messages forcing the soldiers to get underway without staying at Taiyuan for New Year. The soldiers were angry and distressed, and Yang took this opportunity to start an uprising. He had the soldiers pillage the city and take control of the city of Taiyuan. Li Shi was forced to flee to Fen Prefecture (汾州, in modern Linfen, Shanxi). Yang subsequently entered into an alliance with Liu Zhen

In light of Yang's uprising, there were immediate calls among the imperial officials to stop the campaign against Zhaoyi, and even Wang Zai was calling for accepting Liu's surrender. Li Deyu opposed, and again reiterated that Liu's surrender should only be accepted if he and his family bound themselves. Under further advice by Li Deyu, who argued that Yang's uprising could not be tolerated, Emperor Wuzong ordered that the focus of the campaign be shifted, to concentrate on Yang first. To those ends, he ordered Li Shi and Lü to gather troops from nearby prefectures and try to recapture Taiyuan, while ordering Wang Feng to leave Hedong troops at Yushe and instead take troops previously sent by Yiwu (義武, headquartered in modern Baoding, Hebei), Xuanwu, and Yanhai (兗海, headquartered in modern Jining, Shandong) Circuits to head toward Taiyuan. He also ordered Wang Yuankui to divert troops toward Taiyuan as well. This set a panic into the Hedong soldiers at Yushe, who were fearful that the soldiers from other circuits would slaughter their families if Taiyuan fell, so they volunteered to attack Yang with Lü as their commander. In less than a month after Yang took over Taiyuan, the Hedong troops under Lü recaptured the city and arrested Yang, who was subsequently delivered to Chang'an and executed.

Meanwhile, Li Deyu came to believe that, and he informed Emperor Wuzong that, Wang Zai was not putting more pressure on Ze Prefecture for two reasons—because Shi Xiong had been falsely accused by Wang Zai's father Wang Zhixing previously and therefore there was an enmity between the two men (and therefore, Wang Zai was concerned that attacking Ze Prefecture harder would allow Shi to take the chance to capture Lu Prefecture); and that Wang Zai's biological son Wang Yanshi (王晏實), whom Wang Zhixing had adopted as a son and therefore was legally Wang Zai's brother, was the prefect of one of the Zhaoyi prefectures, Ci Prefecture (磁州, in modern Handan) and had been detained by Liu. Emperor Wuzong thus sent Wang Zai an edict in which he again ordered him to advance, and further pressured Wang Zai by moving Liu Mian, who was then the military governor of Yiwu, to Heyang.

Around the same time, Emperor Wuzong had begun to favor a Taoist monk, Zhao Guizhen (趙歸真), despite the advisory officials' advice against it. Emperor Wuzong had to assure Li Deyu that he would not be affected in his policy decisions by Zhao. Meanwhile, Li Deyu was also gaining intelligence information from Zhaoyi officers who surrendered, and was directing Wang Zai, Wang Feng, and He Hongjing in their tactics.

By this point, the Zhaoyi soldiers at Xing, Ming, and Ci Prefectures had been tired out by the war and enraged with Liu Zhen's trusted officer Liu Xi (劉溪), who was collecting taxes even from the soldiers' family members, against the pleas by Liu Congjian's brother-in-law Pei Wen (裴問), whom Liu Zhen had put in charge of the three prefectures. Pei, also angered by Liu Xi and believing the situation to be hopeless, surrendered along with Wang Zhao (王釗) to Wang Yuankui and He Hongjing. At Li Deyu's urging, Emperor Wuzong quickly sent the imperially-commissioned military governor Lu Jun (盧均) to take over the three prefectures, before Wang Yuankui and He Hongjing could consider asking that the three prefectures be annexed to their circuits.

Upon the news of the three prefectures' surrender's arrival in Lu Prefecture, the people of Lu Prefecture became fearful. A group of officers, led by Liu Zhen's trusted officer Guo Yi (郭誼), persuaded Liu that the only way that the Liu clan could be saved was for him to allow them to kill him, present his head to the imperial government, and surrender. Liu thus allowed them to kill him without a fight—and Guo and his followers then nevertheless slaughtered the Liu clan and surrendered to the imperial government.

=== After the Zhaoyi campaign ===
Emperor Wuzong immediately inquired of Li Deyu what his opinion was as to how to deal with Guo Yi. Li Deyu argued that Guo was untrustworthy—having been a major advocate of Liu Zhen's resistance of the imperial regime and then eventually betraying Liu—and Emperor Wuzong agreed, despite misgivings by Du Cong, then also chancellor. Emperor Wuzong thus ordered Shi Xiong to enter Lu Prefecture and, under guise that he was going to distribute commissions to Guo and the other officers involved in Liu's death at a feast, had them rounded up and arrested. Guo and the other officers were subsequently delivered to Chang'an and executed. Also under Emperor Wuzong's orders, Shi exhumed Liu Congjian's body and had it publicly displayed then cut into pieces. For Li Deyu's contributions, Emperor Wuzong created him the Duke of Zhao and gave him the honorary title of Taiwei (太尉, one of the Three Excellencies). (Subsequently, Li Deyu requested a different creation because Li Jifu also carried the title of Duke of Zhao, and he was not Li Jifu's oldest son, suggesting that he would prefer the title of Duke of Wei. Emperor Wuzong agreed and change his title accordingly.)

After the Zhaoyi campaign, Li Deyu was becoming even more powerful in Emperor Wuzong's government, but he was also drawing resentment for his harshness. For example, after the end of the campaign, he had Emperor Wuzong issue an edict announcing that the family members of Li Xun, Wang Ya, and Jia Su, who had previously been sheltered by Liu Congjian and Liu Zhen after fleeing to Zhaoyi but whom Guo then executed, had been executed, referring to them as the family members of traitors. He further had the Zhaoyi officers who had previously surrendered list Liu Zhen's collaborators and were slaughtering them in large numbers, even though Lu Jun was arguing that too many people were being innocently killed. He further carried out reprisals against Li Zongmin and Niu Sengru, accusing them of having been in communications with Liu Congjian and Liu Zhen despite the lack of evidence—going as far as having Liu Congjian's secretary Zheng Qing (鄭慶) claim that whenever Liu Congjian received letters from Li Zongmin or Niu, he would read them and burn them. Emperor Wuzong, believing Li Deyu's accusations, had Li Zongmin and Niu demoted and exiled several times, eventually with Niu being made the secretary general of Xun Prefecture (循州, in modern Huizhou, Guangdong), and Li Zongmin stripped of all offices and exiled to Feng Prefecture (封州, in modern Zhaoqing, Guangdong).

In 845, Li Shen, then the military governor of Huainan, accused one of his subordinates, the magistrate of Jiangdu (江都, in modern Yangzhou), Wu Xiang (吳湘), whose uncle Wu Wuling (吳武陵) had long had an adversarial relationship with Li Deyu, of embezzlement and forcibly marrying the daughter of a commoner, Yan Yue (顏悅). Many advisory officials pointed out that the evidence against Wu Xiang was weak, and Emperor Wuzong sent the censors Cui Yuanzao (崔元藻) and Li Chou (李稠) to review the case. Cui and Li Chou reported that Wu Xiang did embezzle funds, but that his father-in-law Yan was not a commoner, nor was the marriage forced. Li Deyu, despite Cui's and Li Chou's report, nevertheless had Wu Xiang executed, and further, retaliating against Cui and Li Chou for their contrary reports, had them demoted and exiled.

Also in 845, apparently with Li Deyu's support, Emperor Wuzong ordered a general reduction in Buddhist and other temples, including those of Zoroastrian, only leaving two temples each at Chang'an and Luoyang, while each circuit and five large prefectures were allowed to retain one temple each. All other temples were destroyed, and the monks and nuns ordered to return to civilian life. The temples' lands were confiscated, while the building material used for the buildings, statues, and bells were seized to build governmental properties and mint money. (This was the third of the Three Disasters of Wu—major persecutions against Buddhism in Chinese history.)

Later in 845, at Li Deyu's suggestion, Emperor Wuzong established a special treasury for the purpose of border defense, setting aside funds for that purpose. Also, when Emperor Wuzong wanted to create his favorite concubine Consort Wang empress, Li Deyu opposed on the grounds that Consort Wang was of low birth and was sonless, so Emperor Wuzong did not do so. It was said that by this point, as Du Cong and Cui Xuan were no longer chancellors, Li Deyu wielded all the chancellor powers, such that even the eunuchs and Emperor Wuzong were becoming displeased with him. When the imperial attendant Wei Hongzhi (韋弘質) suggested that Li Deyu, as chancellor, should not further be in control of the imperial treasury, Li Deyu submitted a defense of himself and had Wei demoted, further angering other officials.

In spring 846, Emperor Wuzong, suffering from the effects of alchemists' pills designing to lead to immortality, became seriously ill, and the eunuchs decided on having Emperor Wuzong's uncle (Emperor Muzong's younger brother) Li Yi the Prince of Guang, who had been considered to be unintelligent, succeed Emperor Wuzong, and thus issued an edict in Emperor Wuzong's name creating Li Yi crown prince and changing Li Yi's name to Li Chen. When Emperor Wuzong thereafter died, Li Chen became emperor (as Emperor Xuānzong), and during the period of mourning, Li Deyu served as regent.

== During Emperor Xuānzong's reign ==
Emperor Xuānzong, however, was far from unintelligent, and had long resented Li Deyu's hold on power. On the day of his enthronement, Li Deyu served as the ceremonial presenter of the congratulatory notes from the imperial officials. After the ceremony was complete, Emperor Xuānzong stated to his attendants: "Was the person approaching me the Taiwei? Whenever he looked at me, my hairs were raised." The day after the mourning period was over, Emperor Xuānzong sent Li Deyu out of the capital to serve as the military governor of Jingnan Circuit (荊南, headquartered in modern Jingzhou, Hubei), continuing to carry the Tong Zhongshu Menxia Pingzhangshi title as an honorary title. It was said that given how long Li Deyu had been in power, it came as a complete shock to all involved that he would be sent out of the capital. Emperor Xuānzong subsequently also had a number of Li Deyu's associates sent out of the capital. Later in the year, the five former chancellors that Emperor Wuzong had exiled—Niu Sengru, Li Zongmin, Cui Gong, Yang Sifu, and Li Jue—were gradually moved closer to Chang'an (although Li Zongmin died before he could be moved). Li Deyu was subsequently made the defender of Luoyang, and no longer carried the honorary title of Tong Zhongshu Menxia Pingzhangshi. In 847, under the further accusations by Li Deyu's successor as chancellor, Bai Minzhong, Li Deyu was made a senior advisor to the crown prince—an entirely honorary title since there was no crown prince at the time—and ordered to have his office at Luoyang.

In fall 847, Wu Xiang's brother Wu Runa (吳汝納) submitted a petition arguing that Wu Xiang was improperly executed and accusing Li Shen and Li Deyu of causing the improper execution. Emperor Xuānzong recalled Cui Yuanzao from exile and had him give an account of the case to the Office of the Imperial Censors, which subsequently submitted a report agreeing that Wu Xiang was improperly executed. As a result, Li Deyu was further demoted and exiled to be the military advisor to the prefect of Chao Prefecture (潮州, in modern Chaozhou, Guangdong). In fall 848, Li Deyu was further demoted to be the census officer at Yai Prefecture (崖州, in modern Haikou, Hainan), where Li Deyu died around the new year 850. It was said that his casket was allowed to be returned to be Chang'an and buried there only after intercession by the chancellor Linghu Tao—who had dreamed of Li Deyu's pleading with him to do so. However, Li Deyu's titles were only posthumously restored in 860, during the reign of Emperor Xuānzong's son Emperor Yizong, at the urging of the official Liu Ye.

== Posthumous perception ==
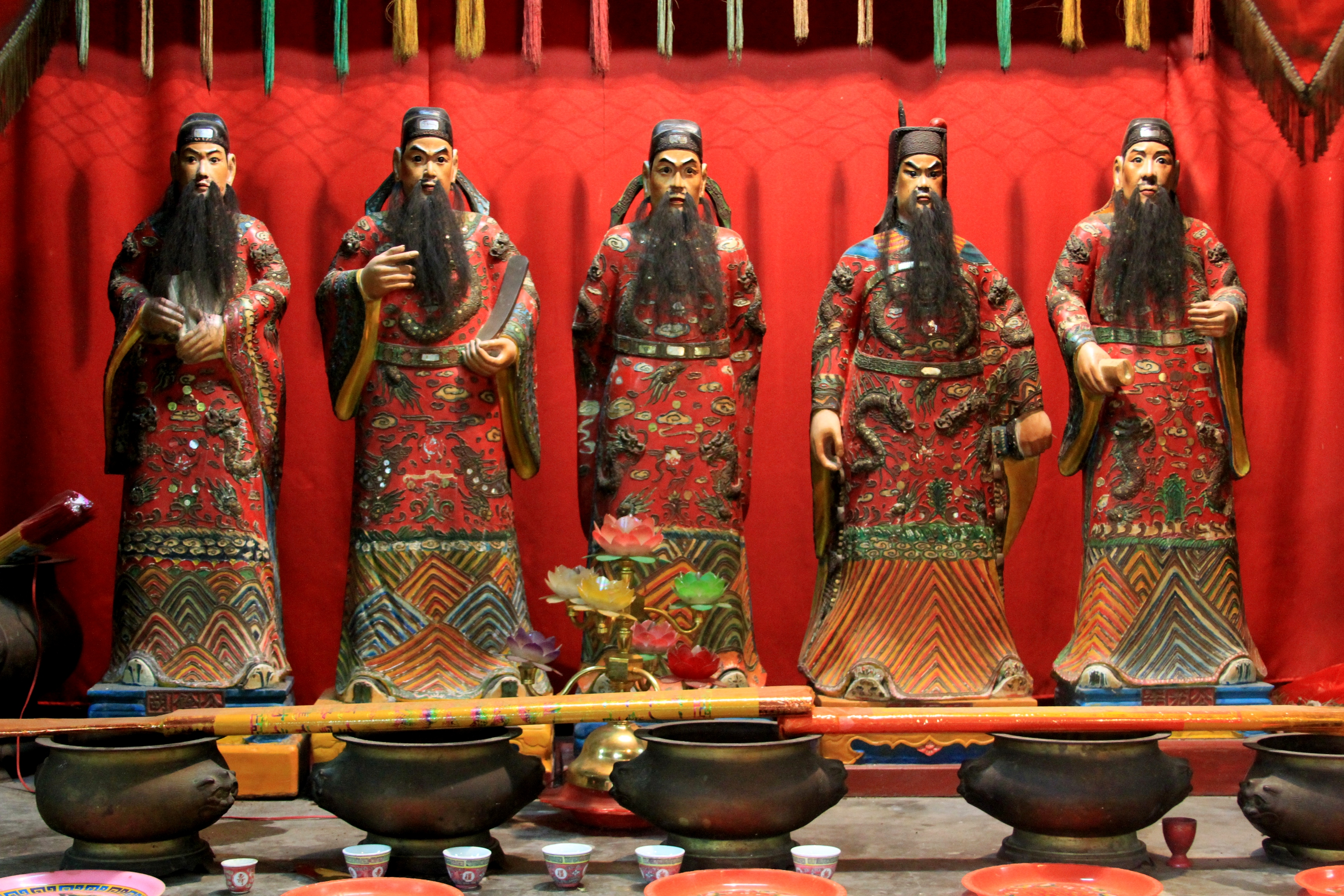
Statues of five exiled officials, including Li Deyu, in the Temple of the Five Lords.

The lead editor of the Old Book of Tang, the Later Jin chancellor Liu Xu, had this to say about Li Deyu:

When I, your subject, was young, I had often heard of the old people talking about the stories of the Duke of Wei. At that time, the Son of Heaven was bright and valiant, quick in decision, and the Duke personally engaged himself to pay the emperor back for his trust. The emperor listened to his advice, and much was accomplished. The relationship between emperor and subject was one that was not often seen for a thousand years. As I read about his advice within the palace and reports in the halls, he anticipated the enemies' moves and came with tactics that led to victories, by his own mind, just like how the famed bowman Yang Youji [(養由基)] would not miss with any of his arrows; he was indeed a rarely seen talent. As far as his literary abilities were concerned, Yan An [(嚴安)] and Sima Xiangru [(both famed writers from the Han dynasty)] could only serve as his scribes. As far as his governing abilities are concerned, not even Xiao He and Cao Can would deserve to sit at the same table as he. It is too harsh to accuse him of power-grabbing. However, what can most be criticized about him is this: he could not forget grudges, could not repay resentment with grace, and could not let disagreements go, but instead gathered opponents around himself. He was therefore effectively fighting commoners with swords and pick-axes, and as a result finally died at the humid sea, and this can be lamented. An old proverb talks about a man who robbed gold at the busy market in the capital because he could not see the passersby. While he was certainly talented, he did not know the proper way to act.

On the island of Hainan, Li Deyu has been commemorated in the Temple of Five Lords since the time of the Ming dynasty.

== In fiction ==
Played by Lau Dan, a fictionalized version of Li Deyu was portrayed in 2009 Hong Kong's TVB television series, Beyond the Realm of Conscience.

== Notes and references ==
- Old Book of Tang, vol. 174.
- New Book of Tang, vol. 180.
- Zizhi Tongjian, vols. 241, 243, 244, 245, 246, 247, 248.
