= Shi Xiong =

Chinese military general and politician

Shi Xiong (Chinese: 石雄) (died 848?) was a Chinese military general and politician of the Chinese Tang dynasty, most known for his participation in two campaigns during the reign of Emperor Wuzong—against the remnants of the Uyghur Khanate, and against the warlord Liu Zhen, who controlled Zhaoyi Circuit (昭義, headquartered in modern Changzhi, Shanxi).

== Career at Wuning Circuit ==
It is not known when Shi Xiong was born. He was from Xu Prefecture (徐州, in modern Xuzhou, Jiangsu), and his family was said to be so lowly that nothing was known about its origins. In his youth, he became an officer of Wuning Circuit (武寧, headquartered at Xu Prefecture), and he was said to be brave and ferocious in battle such that he impressed the entire Wuning army. While there, he served under successive military governors (jiedushi) Cui Qun and Wang Zhixing.

In 827, during the reign of Emperor Wenzong, Wang Zhixing volunteered to participate in an imperial campaign against the warlord Li Tongjie, who controlled Henghai Circuit (橫海, headquartered in modern Cangzhou, Hebei). When he attacked Henghai's Di Prefecture (棣州, in modern Binzhou, Shandong) in 828, he had Shi serve as his forward commander. It was said that the soldiers became so supportive of Shi that they considered overthrowingthe cruel Wang and replacing him with Shi. Fearing this, Wang reported to Emperor Wenzong that Shi, for his battlefield achievements, should be made a prefect. In spring 829, Emperor Wenzong made Shi the prefect of Bi Prefecture (壁州, in modern Bazhong, Sichuan). However, as soon as Shi left Xu Prefecture, Wang massacred some 100 officers who were friendly to Shi in the army, and then submitted a petition accusing Shi of plotting a rebellion, demanding Shi's execution. Emperor Wenzong knew that the accusation was false, but did not dare to offend Wang, and so found Shi guilty. However, he did not execute Shi, but instead exiled him to Bai Prefecture (白州, in modern Yulin, Guangxi).

== Exile and gradual repromotion ==
Sometime after Shi Xiong was exiled to Bai Prefecture, he was made the secretary general of Chen Prefecture (陳州, in modern Zhoukou, Henan). When Dangxiang tribes subsequently raided the region west of the Yellow River (i.e., modern northern Shaanxi), Shi was ordered to serve in the army of Zhenwu Circuit (振武, headquartered in modern Hohhot, Inner Mongolia) under the military governor Liu Mian (劉沔). It was said that while he served with distinction at Zhenwu, Emperor Wenzong did not promote him further in fear of offending Wang Zhixing.

== Campaign against the Uyghurs ==
In 842, by which time Emperor Wenzong's brother Emperor Wuzong was emperor, remnants of Tang's former ally/vassal, the Uyghur Khanate, in light of their defeat at the hands of the Xiajiasi, were raiding the Tang's northern borders. When Uyghur tribes under Wujie Khan raided Tiande (天德, in modern Bayan Nur, Inner Mongolia), the defender of Tiande, Tian Mou (田牟), wanted to engage them, despite the misgivings of the lead chancellor Li Deyu. Li Deyu had known about Shi, from the time that Shi served under Cui Qun (as at that time, Li Deyu was the military governor of Huainan Circuit (淮南, headquartered in modern Yangzhou, Jiangsu), which neighbored Wuning), and so recommended Shi to be Tian's deputy, to help defend against Uyghur raids. In addition to serving as Tian's deputy, Shi was also made the prefect of Shuo Prefecture (朔州, in modern Shuozhou, Shanxi), continuing to be under Liu Mian, who was then the military governor of Hedong Circuit (河東, headquartered in modern Taiyuan, Shanxi).

Meanwhile, Liu informed Shi that the reason why Emperor Wuzong did not want to launch a major campaign to wipe out the displaced Uyghurs was that his aunt Princess Taihe, who had previously married the Uyghur Chongde Khan under the heqin system of marriage alliance, was being held by Wujie Khan. He thus planned, with Shi, to launch a surprise attack to rescue Princess Taihe. In spring 843, when Wujie Khan was attacking Zhenwu, Liu had Shi and Wang Feng (王逢) command the soldiers under the Shatuo chieftain Zhuye Chixin, as well as Qibi (契苾) and Tuoba (拓跋, i.e., Dangxiang) tribesmen, to serve as forward troops, while his own army followed. When Shi arrived at Zhenwu, he ascended the city walls and surveyed the Uyghur camps, when he saw that there were a group of wagons where the people appeared to be wearing Chinese uniforms of red and green colors and appeared to be Chinese. He sent a spy to those wagons, and the spy found out that the group of wagons were under Princess Taihe and her attendants. Shi informed the princess that he was about to launch an attack, and that the princess should remain calm during the attack and remain where she was. At night, he launched a surprise attack on Wujie Khan's tent, surprising him and causing him to flee. Shi, after killing some 10,000 Uyghur people and receiving the surrender of some 20,000 people, escorted Princess Taihe back to Tang territory. Shi was subsequently made the defender of Tiande.

== Campaign against Zhaoyi ==
Later in 843, Emperor Wuzong launched a campaign against the warlord Liu Zhen, who had taken over Zhaoyi Circuit without imperial sanction after the death of the previous military governor, his adoptive father (and biological uncle) Liu Congjian. Emperor Wuzong mobilized the circuits around Zhaoyi, and initially, Li Yanzuo (李彥佐) the military governor of Wuning was set to command the forces of Hezhong Circuit (河中, headquartered in modern Yuncheng, Shanxi). However, Li Yanzuo angered Li Deyu and Emperor Wuzong by proceeding slowly to the front, by suggesting that Zhaoyi not be attacked, and by requesting additional troops. Emperor Wuzong issued an edict rebuking Li Yanzuo and making Shi Xiong his deputy, planning to have Shi replace Li Yanzuo once Shi arrived. Once Shi arrived at the front, he was made the military governor of the Hezhong army. His orders were that he should advance toward Zhaoyi's capital Lu Prefecture (潞州) through Jishi (冀氏, in modern Linfen, Shanxi) but try to cut off a possible surprise attack by stationing troops at Yicheng (翼城, in modern Linfen as well). It was said that the day after Shi's taking over for Li Yuanzuo, he took his troops over Wuling (烏嶺, in modern Linfen as well) and defeating Zhaoyi soldiers at five camps. At that time, the other imperial generals attacking the two western prefectures of Zhaoyi—Wang Zhixing's son Wang Zai and Liu Mian—were both said to be hesitating in their attacks, and Shi's report of victory thus raised the spirit of Emperor Wuzong, who awarded Shi with silk. Shi distributed the silk to the soldiers and only kept a nominal amount for himself, and so it was said that the soldiers appreciated him and fought hard for him. It was also said that Li Deyu urged him to fight on by pointing out that if Liu Zhen surrendered to Wang Zai—which Wang had suggested was something that Liu was considering—then Shi would be without major accomplishments. In spring 844, Shi was made the military governor of Hezhong, as well as the mayor of its capital Hezhong Municipality.

In fall 844, after the three Zhaoyi prefectures east of the Taihang Mountains surrendered to Wang Yuankui and He Hongjing—semi-independent warlords who at the time were obeying imperial orders—Liu's officer Guo Yi (郭誼) killed Liu and his family and surrendered. Guo expected to be made military governor, either of Zhaoyi or of another circuit, as Emperor Wuzong's prior edicts had promised of someone who would kill Liu. However, Emperor Wuzong and Li Deyu found Guo and his coconspirators untrustworthy, and therefore planned to arrest them. They had Shi take 7,000 men to Lu Prefecture (as there was a prophecy during Liu Congjian's governance that Shi would arrive with 7,000 men). When Shi arrived, he used the ruse that he would distribute commissions for Guo and the other officers at a meeting that night, to lure them to the meeting. Once they arrived at the meeting, Shi arrested them and delivered them to the capital Chang'an, where they were executed. Shi also exhumed Liu Congjian's body to have it publicly displayed and then cut into pieces. Subsequently, Shi was transferred to be the military governor of Heyang Circuit (河陽, headquartered in modern Jiaozuo, Henan). He was also given the honorary title of acting Sikong (司空, one of the Three Excellencies.)

== After campaign against Zhaoyi ==
In 845, when Zhaoyi soldiers mutinied against the new military governor, Lu Jun (盧均), Emperor Wuzong ordered Shi Xiong, Wang Zai (then the military governor of Hedong), and Wei Gongfu (韋恭甫) the military governor of Hezhong to launch their troops to cut off potential escape routes of the mutineers, but after Lu was subsequently able to persuade the mutineers to surrender, Shi, Wang, and Wei stood down.

After Emperor Wuzong's death in 846 and succession by his uncle Emperor Xuānzong, Shi was made the military governor of Fengxiang Circuit (鳳翔, headquartered in modern Baoji, Shaanxi). It was said, though, because of what had occurred between Wang Zhixing and Shi, as well as Shi's accomplishments during the Zhaoyi campaign, that Wang Zai despised him and found occasions to defame him. After Li Deyu lost power early in Emperor Xuānzong's reign, Shi thus lost his command. In 848, Shi visited the imperial government and recited his accomplishments at Heishan (i.e., the battle that saved Princess Taihe) and Wuling. He requested a command for himself to live out his old age. However, the chancellor Bai Minzhong, believing that Shi was part of Li Deyu's faction, refused, stating that he had already been sufficiently repaid for his accomplishments with three commands. Instead, Shi was only made a general of the imperial guards with no real authority. Shi was said to die in anger afterwards.

== Notes and references ==
- Old Book of Tang, vol. 161.
- New Book of Tang, vol. 171.
- Zizhi Tongjian, vols. 243, 244, 246, 247, 248.
