= Wang Jingchong =

Wang Jingchong may refer to:

- Wang Jingchong (Tang dynasty) (847–883), military general and de facto independent ruler of Chengde during the late Tang dynasty
- Wang Jingchong (Five Dynasties) (died 950), military general under the Later Jin and Later Han dynasties, unsuccessfully rebelled against Later Han
