= Wujie Qaghan =

Qaghan of the Uyghurs
- Reign: 841–846
- Predecessor: Qasar Qaghan
- Successor: Enian Qaghan
- Born: Yaoluoge Wuxi (藥羅葛烏希)
- Died: 846; Altai Mountains
- House: Ädiz clan (by birth); Yaglakar clan (official)
- Father: Baoyi Qaghan

Wujie Qaghan (烏介可汗) was the twelfth ruler of the Uyghur Khaganate. His Uyghur name was probably Üge (Old Turkic: 𐰇𐰏𐰀, lit. 'Advisor').

== Life ==
Üge was a younger brother of Zhaoli Qaghan and an uncle of Zhangxin Qaghan. He claimed the title qaghan as Wujie Qaghan, with the support of 13 tribes, after the Kyrgyz Khaganate invaded in 841. One of his first acts was to ambush the Kyrgyz escort who was guarding Princess Taihe. After her capture, he had her write to Emperor Wuzong, requesting him to recognize him as the new qaghan. He also asked him to lend him the border city of Zhenwu (振武, in modern Hohhot, Inner Mongolia), to allow him to plan the rebuilding of the Uyghur Khaganate. Wuzong responded with an edict that instructed Wujie to remain outside Tang borders. He also requestedTaihe to personally return to Chang'an to report on the Uyghurs' status. Wujie also demanded the protection of Manichean temples in China, the retrieval of the Uyghur noble Wamosi (later Li Sizhong) and troops for aid.

Wujie did not follow Emperor Wuzong's orders and pillaged the Tang's northern territory in earnest. He also made another request to borrow the border city of Tiande (天德, in modern Bayan Nur, Inner Mongolia), which Wuzong rejected. Wuzong further wrote a rebuking letter to Wujie, warning of consequences, and again ordering him to have Princess Taihe personally report and make requests. Wuzong also mobilized the forces of the circuits on the northern border, preparing a major retributive campaign against the Uyghurs. In the winter of 842, he also had the chancellor Li Deyu write a letter in his own name, addressed to Taihe, sending it to the Uyghur remnants along with winter clothes as a gift for Taihe. Also in 842, at Li Deyu's advice, Wuzong ordered Tiande's commander Tian Mou (田牟) to stop engaging the Uyghurs, but instead entice them with food supplies and send them to Hedong Circuit (河東, headquartered in modern Taiyuan, Shanxi). Also under Li Deyu's recommendation, the general Shi Xiong was sent to Tiande to assist Tian in defending against Uyghur raids.

In February 843, Wujie launched an attack on Zhenwu. Tang forces, commanded by generals Shi Xiong and Zhuye Chixin, prepared a surprise counter-attack. Li Sizhong also subsequently volunteered to fight the Uyghur remnants along with soldiers from the Qibi (契苾), Shatuo, and Tuyuhun tribesmen; in response, Emperor Wuzong ordered two prefects, He Qingchao (何清朝) and Qibi Tong (契苾通), to report to him with 6,000 troops each. When Shi Xiong arrived near the Uyghur camp, he noticed that there were some special wagons lined with rugs and that the servants in those wagons were wearing red and green-colored robes that appeared to be Chinese. He sent a scout named Cai Xi to make contact and found out that these were Princess Taihe's train. He then had the scout again inform Taihe of his plans to attack and asked her and her servants to remain calm and not move during the attack. At night, he made a surprise attack on Wujie's tent and his forces collapsed on 13 February 843. Wujie fled, and Shi then escorted Taihe back to Tang territory.

== Death and succession ==
Wujie fled to Heichezi (黑车子), a Shiwei tribe at first. His defeat also meant a ban on Manichaeism in China. However he was still active for next three years fleeing from the Kyrgyz and Tang. He died in 846 in a battle near the Altai Mountains or was perhaps assassinated by one of Li Sizhong's men. He was succeeded by his younger brother Enian Qaghan.
