= Ädiz clan =

Turkic royal clan

Ädiz Old Turkic: 𐰓𐰔, romanized: Ediz Chinese: 阿跌; pinyin: Ādiē
- Connected families: Yaglakar clan
- Dissolution: 848

The Ädiz clan was the second imperial clan of the Uyghur Khaganate.

== Tribe ==
The Ädiz clan was originally a member of the Tiele Confederation and not a Uyghur subtribe; Chinese sources listed Ädiz (阿跌 Ädiē) as the 14th of, at least, 15 named Tiele tribes. They were living on shores of the Syr Darya during the 7th century. They later migrated to near Lake Baikal, and became part of the Xueyantuo during the reign of Zhenzhu Khan. After their submission to the Tang dynasty, they were appointed to Jitian Prefecture (雞田州) — one of the prefectures that the Tang dynasty established for the settlement of Tiele tribes that submitted to the Tang during the reign of Emperor Taizong in the Hequ (河曲, i.e., the Ordos Desert region). Their chieftain Ädie Liangchen (阿跌良臣, literally: "Good Minister from the Ädiz") and his tribal army were part of the army of Shuofang Circuit (朔方, headquartered in modern Yinchuan, Ningxia). His son Ädiz Guangyan (Li Guangyan) later adopted an imperial surname and became a general in the Tang army. He died in 826.

The Ädiz clan was also mentioned in Orkhon Inscriptions as a tribe subjugated by Kul Tigin.

== Royal clan ==
The first leader of the Uyghur Khaganate was Qutluq II. He was orphaned early in childhood and adopted by the Yaglakar clan. After Qutluq Bilge's untimely death, he was elected as qaghan by the nobles. He didn't change his surname back to Ädiz, keeping the Yaglakar name, nevertheless he exiled all of the remaining princes from cadet branches to Chang'an.

Personal Name	Turkic title	Chinese title	Reign
Adie Guduolu, later Yaoluoge Guduolu	Ay Tengride Ulugh Bolmish Alp Qutluq Külüg Bilge Qaghan	Huaixin Qaghan (懷信可汗)	795–808
	Ay Tengride Qut Bolmish Alp Bilge Qaghan	Baoyi Qaghan (保義可汗)	808–821
	Gün Tengride Ulugh Bolmish Küçlüg Bilge Qaghan	Chongde Qaghan (崇德可汗)	821–824
Yaoluoge Hesa	Ay Tengride Qut Bolmish Alp Bilge Qaghan	Zhaoli Qaghan (昭禮可汗)	824–833
Yaoluoge Hu	Ay Tengride Qut Bolmish Alp Külüg Bilge Qaghan	Zhangxin Qaghan (彰信可汗)	833–839
Jueluowu or Yaoluoge Hesa		Qasar Qaghan (㕎馺特勒)	839–840
Yaoluoge Wuxi		Wujie Qaghan (烏介可汗)	841–846
Yaoluoge E'nian		Enian Qaghan (遏捻可汗)	846–848

A son of Chongde Qaghan, Womosi was later made Prince of Huaihua (懷化王) and was bestowed the Imperial Clan surname Li (李). Wamosi's brothers Alizhi (阿歷支), Xiwuchuo (習勿啜), and Wuluosi (烏羅思) were given the names of Li Sizhen (李思貞), Li Siyi (李思義), and Li Sili (李思禮), respectively.
