= Enian Qaghan =

Qaghan of the Uyghurs
- Reign: 846–848
- Predecessor: Wujie Qaghan
- Born: Yaoluoge Enian (藥羅葛遏捻)
- House: Ädiz clan (by birth); Yaglakar clan (official)
- Father: Baoyi Qaghan

Enian Qaghan (遏捻可汗) was the last effective ruler (qaghan) of the Uyghur Khaganate.

== Life ==
Enian Qaghan was a younger brother of Wujie Qaghan and succeeded him in 846. He had 5,000 Uyghur followers under his command and lived among the Kumo Xi and depended on their chieftain Shi Shelang (石捨朗) for support. However this support ended when Zhang Zhongwu invaded Xi domains in the summer of 847. After Zhang's victory over the Xi, Enian was forced to flee further to the Shiwei. In 848, apparently to try to appease the Tang, Enian sent an emissary to pay homage to Emperor Xuānzong. When the emissary was returning to Enian through You Prefecture, however, Zhang ordered him to kill Enian once he arrived back at Uyghur headquarters. When Enian heard this, he fled westward with his wife, son and 12 bodyguards, leaving his people with the Shiwei. His subsequent fate is unknown.
