= Temple of the Five Lords =

Chinese Temple

Coordinates: 20°0′35.79″N 110°21′17.34″E

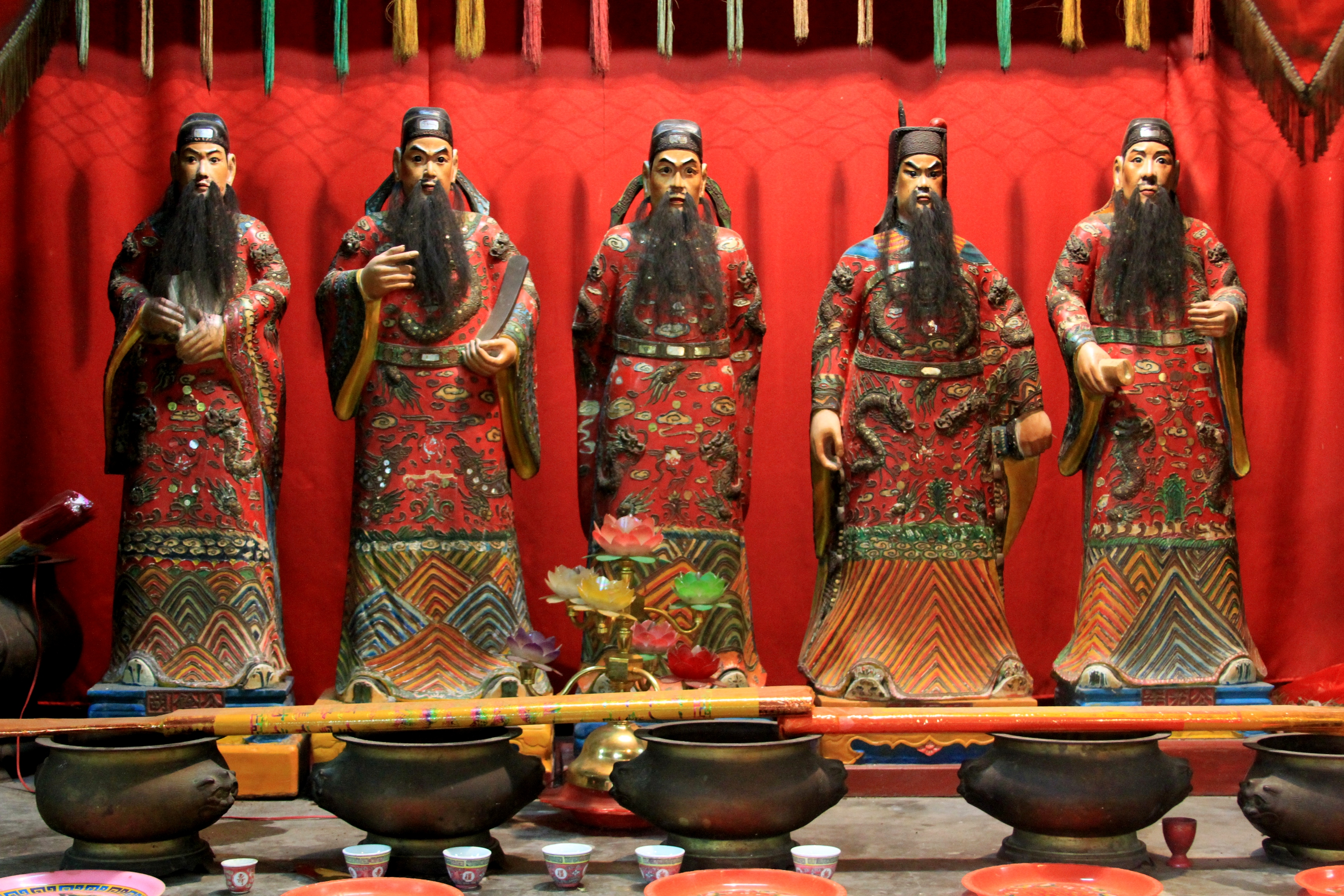
Statues of the five officials inside the temple

The Temple of the Five Lords (Chinese: 五公祠; pinyin: Wǔgōng Cí), also known as the "Temple of the Five Officials", is a memorial shrine to five exiled officials from the Tang and Song dynasties that is located to the southeast of the city of Haikou on the island of Hainan, China. During the times of these dynasties, Hainan was perceived as a remote part of the empire and was used as a place for banishment for disgraced court officials. All five officials worshipped at the temple encountered such a fate, typically after losing power struggles within the imperial court.

Notable buildings of the temple complex are the Five Lords Ancestral Hall proper (Chinese: 五公祠; pinyin: Wǔgōng Cí), the Guanjia Hall (Chinese: 观稼堂; pinyin: Guānjià Táng; lit. 'observe the crops hall'), the Xuepu Hall (Chinese: 学圃堂; pinyin: Xuépǔ Táng; lit. 'gardening study hall'), the East Hall (Chinese: 东斋; pinyin: Dōng Zhāi) and West Hall (Chinese: 西斋; pinyin: Xī Zhāi, also known as Chinese: 五公精舍; pinyin: Wǔgōng Jīngshè), the Sugong Ancestral Hall (Chinese: 苏公祠; pinyin: Sūgōng Cí), the Ancestral Hall of the Two Fubo Generals (Chinese: 两伏波祠; pinyin: Liǎng Fúbō Cí), the Bai Pavilion (Chinese: 拜亭; pinyin: Bài Tíng; lit. 'worship pavilion'), the Dongzhuo Pavilion (Chinese: 洞酌亭; pinyin: Dòngzhuó Tíng; lit. 'deliberation pavilion'), the Suquan Pavilion (Chinese: 粟泉亭; pinyin: Sùquán Tíng; lit. 'millet spring pavilion'), the Xixin Hall (Chinese: 洗心轩; pinyin: Xǐxīn Xuān; lit. 'heart washing hall'), and the Youxian Cave (Chinese: 游仙洞; pinyin: Yóuxiān Dòng; lit. 'wandering immortal cave').

In total, the temple complex covers an area of 2800 square meters.

The temple's main building is the Five Lords Ancestral Hall. It is a red two-story wooden structure that stands more than 9 meters tall and has a total floor space of 560 square meters. A historical inscription on a board placed over the front entrance on the second floor declares it the "first building in Hainan". The earliest buildings of the complex were erected during the reign of Wanli Emperor (1572–1620) of the Ming dynasty. The temple has undergone a major restoration during the reign of the Qing emperor Guanggxu (in 1889) followed by minor repairs that were carried out later.

The five officials commemorated in the temple are the Tang chancellor Li Deyu (Chinese: 李德裕, 787–850), and the four Song ministers Li Gang (Chinese: 李纲, 1083–1140), Li Guang (Chinese: 李光, 1078–1159), Zhao Ding (Chinese: 赵鼎, 1085–1147, also known for his poetry), and Hu Quan (Chinese: 胡铨, 1102–1180). Each of the officials had been banished to Hainan Province after having fallen out of the court's favor and is now represented by a stone statue placed on the temple grounds.

The Ancestral Hall of the Two Fubo Generals is dedicated to the two generals Lu Bode (Chinese: 路博德; pinyin: Lù Bódé, captured Hainan in 110 BC) of the Western Han dynasty and Ma Yuan (Chinese: 馬援; pinyin: Mǎ Yuán, 14 BC – 49 AD) of the Eastern Han dynasty. Both generals played important roles in establishing Chinese rule over Hainan and were recognized by their emperors with the honorary title "Fubo General" (Chinese: 伏波将军; pinyin: fúbō jiāngjūn) for their achievements.

The Sugong Temple is located to the southeast of the Temple of Five Lords. It commemorates Su Shi (Chinese: 苏轼), a renowned poet and statesman of the Song dynasty, who was also banished to Hainan.

The temple is located near the administrative border between the City of Haikou and Qiongshan District, about 5 kilometers away from the city center of Haikou.

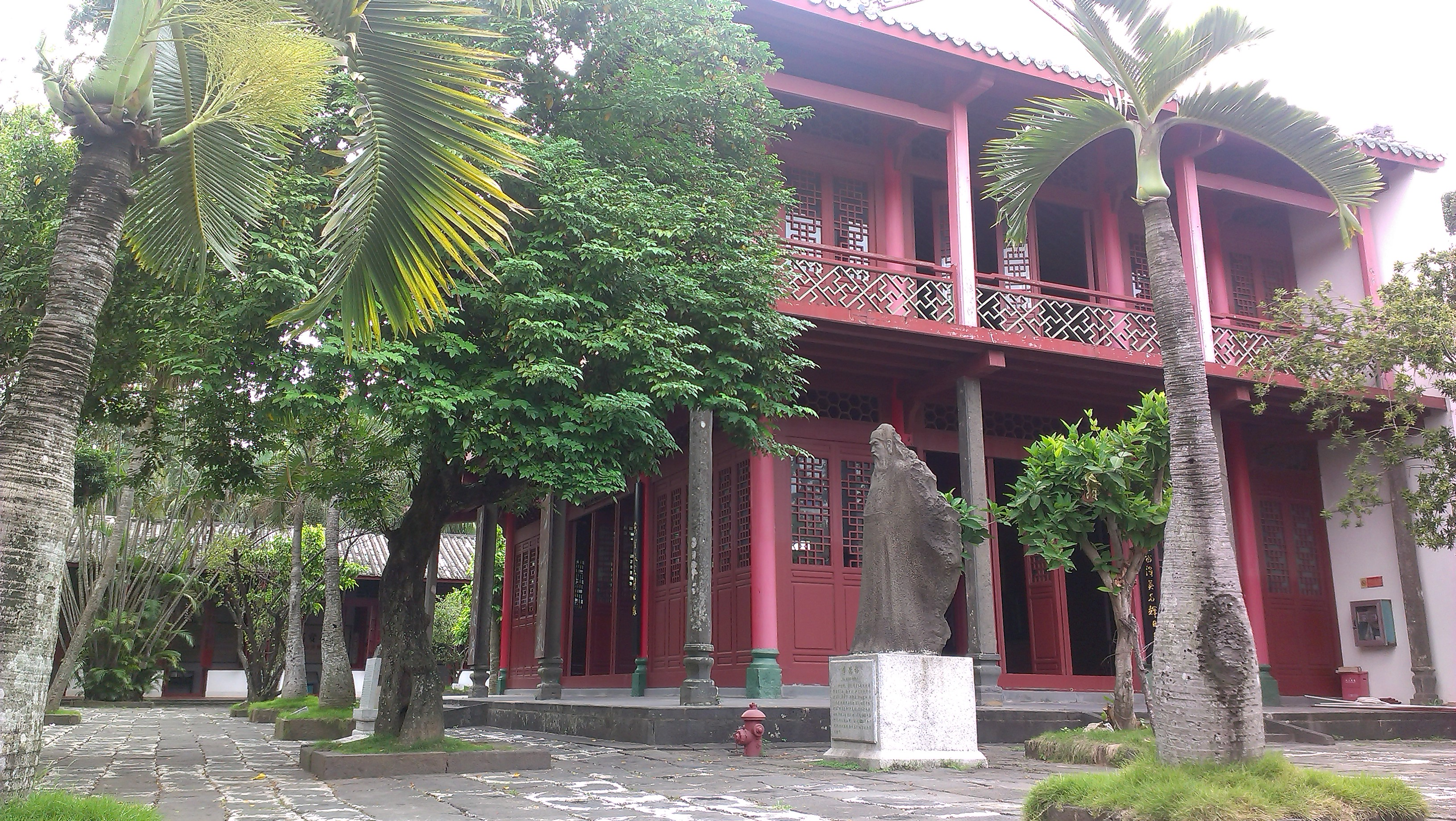
Garden in the temple.

== Five officials ==
=== Li Deyu (787–850) ===
Li Deyu (Chinese: 李德裕) served as chancellor (Chinese: 宰相; pinyin: zǎixiàng) during the Tang dynasty. He was the leader and namesake of the Li faction during the Niu-Li Factional Struggles that pitted officials of humble and aristocratic origins against each other. Tang Emperor Xuānzong ended the struggles by handing complete defeat to the Li faction, demoting Li Deyu and sending him to exile in Hainan, where he held the position of census officer at Yai Prefecture (modern Haikou) and remained until his death.

=== Li Gang (1083–1140) ===
Li Gang (Chinese: 李纲) was a government official who held the office of chancellor for a brief period (75 days) during final days of the Northern Song dynasty. He was put in charge of the defense against the invading Jin dynasty by the young Emperor Qinzong during the Jin-Song wars, but was removed from his post when the emperor was falsely hoping to enter peace negotiations with the Jin. The Northern Song dynasty fell in 1127 and Emperor Qinzong became a prisoner of the Jin dynasty for the rest of his life. Li Gang was released from exile and rehabilitated in 1129 and held various government offices in the Southern Song dynasty.

=== Li Guang (1078–1159) ===
Li Guang (Chinese: 李光) was exiled to Qiongzhou (now Haikou) in Hainan in 1144.

=== Zhao Ding (1085–1147) ===
Zhao Ding (Chinese: 赵鼎) was a statesman and renowned poet of the Southern Song dynasty. He advocated attempts to recover territory lost to the Jin dynasty and committed suicide dying as a result of a hunger strike.

=== Hu Quan (1102–1180) ===
Hu Quan (Chinese: 胡铨). In 1148, during the rule of Qin Hui, he was exiled to Hainan. In 1155, after the death of Quin Hui, he was able to resume his duties.
