= Wang Jingchong (Tang dynasty) =

Chinese general (847–883)

Wang Jingchong (Chinese: 王景崇; 847–883), courtesy name Meng'an (孟安), formally Prince Zhongmu of Changshan (常山忠穆王), was a general of the Chinese Tang dynasty who followed a line of his ancestors in ruling Chengde Circuit (成德, headquartered in modern Shijiazhuang, Hebei) as its military governor (jiedushi) in de facto independence from the imperial government.

== Background ==
Wang Jingchong was born in 847, during the reign of Emperor Xuānzong. At that time, his grandfather Wang Yuankui ruled Chengde Circuit in de facto independence from the imperial government, but maintained a good relationship with the imperial government and largely followed imperial orders; he also married a Tang imperial princess (Princess Shou'an, a granddaughter of Emperor Xuānzong's father Emperor Xianzong. Wang Jingchong's father Wang Shaoding was the oldest son of Wang Yuankui's, by Princess Shou'an, and served as Wang Yuankui's deputy. Wang Jingchong himself, while not the oldest among his brothers (he had at least one older brother, Wang Jingyin (王景胤), and at least one younger brother, Wang Jingyu (王景敔)), was the oldest (or only) son of Wang Shaoding's wife, and therefore viewed as the eventual heir of Wang Shaoding.

Wang Yuankui died in 855, and Wang Shaoding succeeded him, with imperial sanction. Wang Shaoding, however, was said to mistreat his people and waste his time on feasts, leading to the soldier's plotting rebellion. Before any plot came to fruition, however, Wang Shaoding died of illness, and the soldiers supported his younger brother (and Wang Jingchong's uncle) Wang Shaoyi as his successor. Emperor Xuānzong approved the succession.

During Wang Shaoyi's military governorship, Wang Jingchong served as the acting commandant of Chengde's capital Zhen Prefecture (鎮州), as well as the commander of the army. In 866, Wang Shaoyi grew ill. He summoned Wang Jingchong and stated to Wang Jingchong:

Because my older brother saw that you were young, he entrusted the command of the army and the governance of the circuit to me. You are now grown, so I am returning those authorities to you. Work hard, be faithful to the imperial government, be peaceful with the neighboring circuits, and do not destroy my brother's heritage. This will be your accomplishment.

Wang Shaoyi died after speaking. Emperor Xuānzong's son and successor Emperor Yizong subsequently approved the succession and made Wang Jingchong first acting military governor, and then military governor later in 866.

== As military governor ==
=== During Emperor Yizong's reign ===
It was said that the imperial government had a good relationship with Wang Jingchong since he was the grandson of a princess. During the rebellion of Pang Xun at Xu Prefecture (徐州, in modern Xuzhou, Jiangsu), Wang contributed troops to the imperial cause, and after Pang's rebellion was put down, Wang was created the Baron of Taiyuan. It was said that when Princess Shou'an died, Wang observed a mourning period appropriately, and was praised by the imperial officials. After he was subsequently formally recalled to active service, he was given the honorific title of acting Sikong (司空, one of the Three Excellencies).

In 870, when He Quanhao the military governor of neighboring Weibo Circuit (魏博, headquartered in modern Handan, Hebei) was killed in a mutiny, the Weibo soldiers supported the officer Han Junxiong to succeed He Quanhao. It was said that because Wang also submitted a petition on Han's behalf that Emperor Yizong approved of Han's takeover. Later in the year, Emperor Yizong bestowed the honorific chancellor designation of Tong Zhongshu Menxia Pingzhangshi (同中書門下平章事) on him.

=== During Emperor Xizong's reign ===
In 873, Emperor Yizong died and was succeeded by his son Emperor Xizong. Emperor Xizong bestowed a number of honorific titles on military governors, and Wang received the greater honorific chancellor title of Zhongshu Ling (中書令). In 875, Wang's honorific chancellor title was changed to Shizhong (侍中). During this period, he was also successively created the Duke of Zhao and then the Prince of Changshan. Also, during this time, his mother Lady of Qin died, but he was then formally recalled to active service.

In 880, the agrarian rebel Huang Chao captured the imperial capital Chang'an, forced Emperor Yizong to flee, and established his own state of Qi as its emperor. Wang's neighbor, Wang Chucun the military governor of Yiwu Circuit (義武, headquartered in modern Baoding, Hebei), upon hearing the news of Chang'an's fall, mobilized all of Yiwu's troops and headed for Chang'an, subsequently participating in a major campaign against Huang's Qi state on Tang's behalf. Wang Jingchong sent troops to accompany Wang Chucun on his campaign, although, unlike Wang Chucun, he did not personally attend to the campaign. However, he often sent messengers to Emperor Xizong, who had fled to Xichuan Circuit (西川, headquartered in modern Chengdu, Sichuan) by this point, to greet the emperor and to submit tributes. After Huang's Qi state was destroyed, Wang Jingchong was thus given the honorific title of Taiwei (太尉, also one of the Three Excellencies, but now no longer acting).

Wang Jingchong died in 883. The soldiers supported his nine-year-old son Wang Rong as his successor, and the imperial government, then in disarray, subsequently approved.

== Notes and references ==
- Old Book of Tang, vol. 142.
- New Book of Tang, vol. 211.
- Zizhi Tongjian, vols. 250, 252, 255.
