= Wang Shaoding =

Wang Shaoding (Chinese: 王紹鼎; died 857), courtesy name Sixian (嗣先), was a general of the Chinese Tang dynasty, briefly ruling Chengde Circuit (成德, headquartered in modern Shijiazhuang, Hebei) in de facto independence from the imperial government as military governor (Jiedushi).

== Background ==
It is not known when Wang Shaoding was born. His family had been, prior to him, in control of Chengde Circuit for two generations, after his grandfather Wang Tingcou seized control of the circuit in 821 without imperial approval and eventually forced the imperial government to acquiesce; his father Wang Yuankui later succeeded Wang Tingcou and took a more conciliatory stance with the imperial government. Wang Shaoding was Wang Yuankui's oldest son. During Wang Yuankui's rule of Chengde, Wang Shaoding became deputy military governor, the commander of the Chengde troops, and acting commandant of Chengde's capital Zhen Prefecture (鎮州). When Wang Yuankui died in 855, the soldiers supported Wang Shaoding to succeed him. Then-reigning Emperor Xuānzong initially made Wang Shaoding acting military governor, and, later in the year, full military governor.

== As military governor ==
Wang Shaoding, however, was said to be inappropriate in his behavior, favoring drinking, and particularly liking to sling bullets at people from towers for fun. The soldiers became so displeased with him that they considered overthrowing him, but before they could do so, he fell ill and died in 857. The soldiers supported his younger brother Wang Shaoyi to be the new military governor, and Emperor Xuānzong approved the succession and granted Wang Shaoding posthumous honors. Wang Shaoding's son Wang Jingchong later succeeded Wang Shaoyi.

== Notes and references ==
- Old Book of Tang, vol. 142.
- New Book of Tang, vol. 211.
- Zizhi Tongjian, vol. 249.
