= Wang Zai =

Wang Zai (Chinese: 王宰), né Wang Yanzai (王晏宰), was a general of the Chinese Tang dynasty, most well known for his participation in Emperor Wuzong's campaign against the warlord Liu Zhen, who ruled Zhaoyi Circuit (昭義, headquartered in modern Changzhi, Shanxi).

== Background ==
It is not known when Wang Yanzai was born, but it is known that he was probably the second of nine sons of his father Wang Zhixing, who was a long-time military governor (jiedushi) of Wuning Circuit (武寧, headquartered in modern Xuzhou, Jiangsu). He was considered the most talented among his brothers. At an unknown point in his life, the character "Yan" was removed from his name, and he became known just as Wang Zai. One of his sons, Wang Yanshi (王晏實), was so loved by his father Wang Zhixing that Wang Zhixing adopted Wang Yanshi as his own son, so legally, Wang Yanshi became a brother to him.

== Early career ==
Wang Zai was said to be resolute in his youth, and he became an officer in the Shence Armies, then under the control of the powerful eunuchs. He was said to have participated in suppressing the plot by Emperor Wenzong and his associates Li Xun and Zheng Zhu to slaughter the eunuchs in 835—known as the Ganlu Incident—while serving in the Shence Armies. Thereafter, he served as the prefect of Guang Prefecture (光州, in modern Xinyang, Henan). Subsequently, at the suggestion of his superior, the former chancellor Duan Wenchang the military governor of Huainan Circuit (淮南, headquartered in modern Yangzhou, Jiangsu), Wang was moved to be the prefect of Yan Prefecture (鹽州, in modern Yulin, Shaanxi). It was said that he was strict at Yan Prefecture and the people did not appreciate him. He was later promoted to be the military governor of Binning Circuit (邠寧, headquartered in modern Xianyang, Shaanxi). After the campaigns against the remnants of the Uyghur Khanate early in the reign of Emperor Wenzong's brother and successor Emperor Wuzong, in 843, Wang was moved to be the military governor of Zhongwu Circuit (忠武, headquartered in modern Xuchang, Henan).

== Campaign against Zhaoyi ==
Soon after Wang Zai's commission as military governor of Zhongwu, Emperor Wuzong declared a general campaign against Liu Zhen, who had seized control of Zhaoyi Circuit after the death of his adoptive father (and biological uncle) Liu Congjian, who was previously military governor, without imperial sanction. Initially, Zhongwu was not one of the circuits mobilized against Zhaoyi. However, He Hongjing the military governor of Weibo Circuit (魏博, headquartered in modern Handan, Hebei)—one of the circuits that Emperor Wuzong did mobilize—who had been governing Weibo in de facto independence from the imperial government, had been trying to intercede on Liu Zhen's behalf, and had not launched his own troops against Zhaoyi. In order to pressure He Hongjing, Emperor Wuzong ordered Wang Zai to mobilize his troops and cut through Weibo to attack Zhaoyi's Ci Prefecture (磁州, in modern Handan). When He Hongjing heard of Wang's orders, he became apprehensive that if Zhongwu forces entered Weibo that his soldiers could rebel against him; he thus launched his troops in a hurry to attack Ci Prefecture.

After He Hongjing launched his troops, with the objective of pressuring He Hongjing having been accomplished, Emperor Wuzong, at the advice of the lead chancellor Li Deyu, diverted Wang Zai to Heyang Circuit (河陽, headquartered in modern Jiaozuo, Henan) instead, as Heyang troops had recently been dealt a serious defeat by Zhaoyi forces under the command of the officer Xue Maoqing (薛茂卿), and its defense had been further hampered by the illness that its military governor Wang Maoyuan (王茂元) was suffering. When Wang Maoyuan subsequently died, Emperor Wuzong had Wang Zai take over the command of the Heyang troops, then at Wanshan (萬善, in modern Jiaozuo, Henan), as well, although he gave the command of the circuit itself to Jing Xin (敬昕), rather than giving Wang Zai the command of Heyang as well.

Once Wang Zai arrived at the front, it was said that because Wang's troops had strict discipline, the Zhaoyi soldiers became apprehensive of him. Meanwhile, Xue had become resentful toward Liu Zhen, as Liu had not rewarded Xue for his great victory over Heyang troops—believing that it was Xue's victory that aggravated the imperial government into refusing peace. Xue therefore initiated secret contacts with Wang. When Wang subsequently attacked Tianjing Pass (天井關, in modern Jincheng, Shanxi), which Xue had previously captured, Xue made only minimal efforts to resist him before withdrawing and allowing Wang to recover Tianjing Pass. Xue withdrew to Ze Prefecture (澤州, in modern Jincheng) and secretly urged Wang to attack Ze Prefecture quickly, promising to surrender Ze Prefecture to him when he arrived. Wang, however, doubted Xue's sincerity and did not do so. Xue's plans were subsequently leaked, and Liu summoned him back to Zhaoyi's capital Lu Prefecture (潞州) and killed him and his family. The Zhaoyi forces on the Ze Prefecture front were taken over by another Zhaoyi officer, Liu Gongzhi (劉公直), who subsequently recaptured Tianjing Pass from Wang. Wang was subsequently able to in turn deal Liu Gongzhi a loss and capture Lingchuan (陵川, in modern Jincheng), but his and Liu Gongzhi's forces subsequently stalemated.

On Chinese New Year's Day 844, soldiers at Taiyuan Municipality, the capital of the imperially-controlled Hedong Circuit (河東, headquartered in modern Taiyuan, Shanxi), mutinied against the military governor Li Shi, under the leadership of the officer Yang Bian (楊弁). Li Shi was forced to flee. Yang subsequently entered into an alliance with Liu Zhen. In light of this, Wang advocated accepting Liu Zhen's offer to submit, and sent messengers to Lu Prefecture to see what Liu Zhen's intentions were. Li Deyu, however, advocated against peace, and argued that neither Yang nor Liu Zhen should be allowed to remain. When other Hedong soldiers, who were previously attacking Zhaoyi, subsequently recaptured Taiyuan and put down Yang's mutiny, Li Deyu pointed out to Emperor Wuzong two reasons why he believed that Wang wanted peace—because Shi Xiong, who commanded an army against Zhaoyi that was then closer to Lu Prefecture than Wang, had been previously falsely accused by Wang Zhixing, and therefore an enmity existed between Shi and Wang; and because Wang Yanshi, who had been the prefect of Ci Prefecture, was then detained by Liu Zhen. Emperor Wuzong thereafter issued an edict urging Wang Zai to continue his offensive, pointing out that he knew Wang Yanshi's importance to him, but the welfare of the state had to come first.

In order to pressure Wang Zai, Emperor Wuzong subsequently, at Li Deyu's suggestion, transferred Liu Mian (劉沔) the military governor of Yicheng Circuit (義成, headquartered in modern Anyang, Henan) to Heyang, and had him take his troops to Wanshan, close to Wang's camp. Wang, thereafter, attacked Ze Prefecture in summer 844, but did not capture it immediately. Subsequently, in fall 844, the three Zhaoyi prefectures east of the Taihang Mountains, angry at the taxes that officers Liu Zhen sent were imposing on them, surrendered to He Hongjing and Wang Yuankui the military governor of Chengde Circuit (成德, headquartered in modern Shijiazhuang, Hebei). When this news reached Lu Prefecture, Liu Zhen's officer Guo Yi (郭誼) killed Liu Zhen and surrendered to the imperial forces. Liu Zhen's head was subsequently delivered through Ze Prefecture to the imperial camp, and when it arrived at Liu Gongzhi's camp, Liu Gongzhi, after the entire army wept in grief, surrendered to Wang Zai.

== After campaign against Zhaoyi ==
Late in 844, Emperor Wuzong made Wang Zai the military governor of Hedong Circuit. In 845, when Zhaoyi soldiers mutinied against the new military governor, Lu Jun (盧均), Emperor Wuzong ordered Wang, Shi Xiong (then the military governor of Heyang), and Wei Gongfu (韋恭甫) the military governor of Hezhong to launch their troops to cut off potential escape routes of the mutineers, but after Lu was subsequently able to persuade the mutineers to surrender, Wang, Shi, and Wei stood down.

After Emperor Wuzong died in 846 and was succeeded by his uncle Emperor Xuānzong, the Tufan general Lun Kongre (論恐熱) took the opportunity to raid to attack the area west of the Yellow River (i.e., modern northern Shaanxi). Emperor Xuānzong ordered Wang to engage Lun. Wang, with the Shatuo chieftain Zhuye Chixin as his forward commander, did so, and he defeated Lun at Yan Prefecture.

In 849, Wang went to the capital Chang'an to pay homage to Emperor Xuānzong. While at Chang'an, he bribed many high-level officials, hoping to be able to be transferred to Xuanwu Circuit (宣武, headquartered in modern Kaifeng, Henan), and be made an honorary chancellor. Both of these aspirations, however, were opposed by the chancellor Zhou Chi, and Wang was forced to return to Hedong. Later, after he suffered an illness, he was transferred to Heyang. Yet later, he was made an advisor to the Crown Prince, to have his office at the eastern capital Luoyang. He died while there, although the time of his death is not recorded.

== Notes and references ==
Notes

Sources

- Old Book of Tang, vol. 156.
- New Book of Tang, vol. 172.
- Zizhi Tongjian, vols. 247, 248.
