= Karabalgasun inscription =

Uighur inscription dated to 9th century

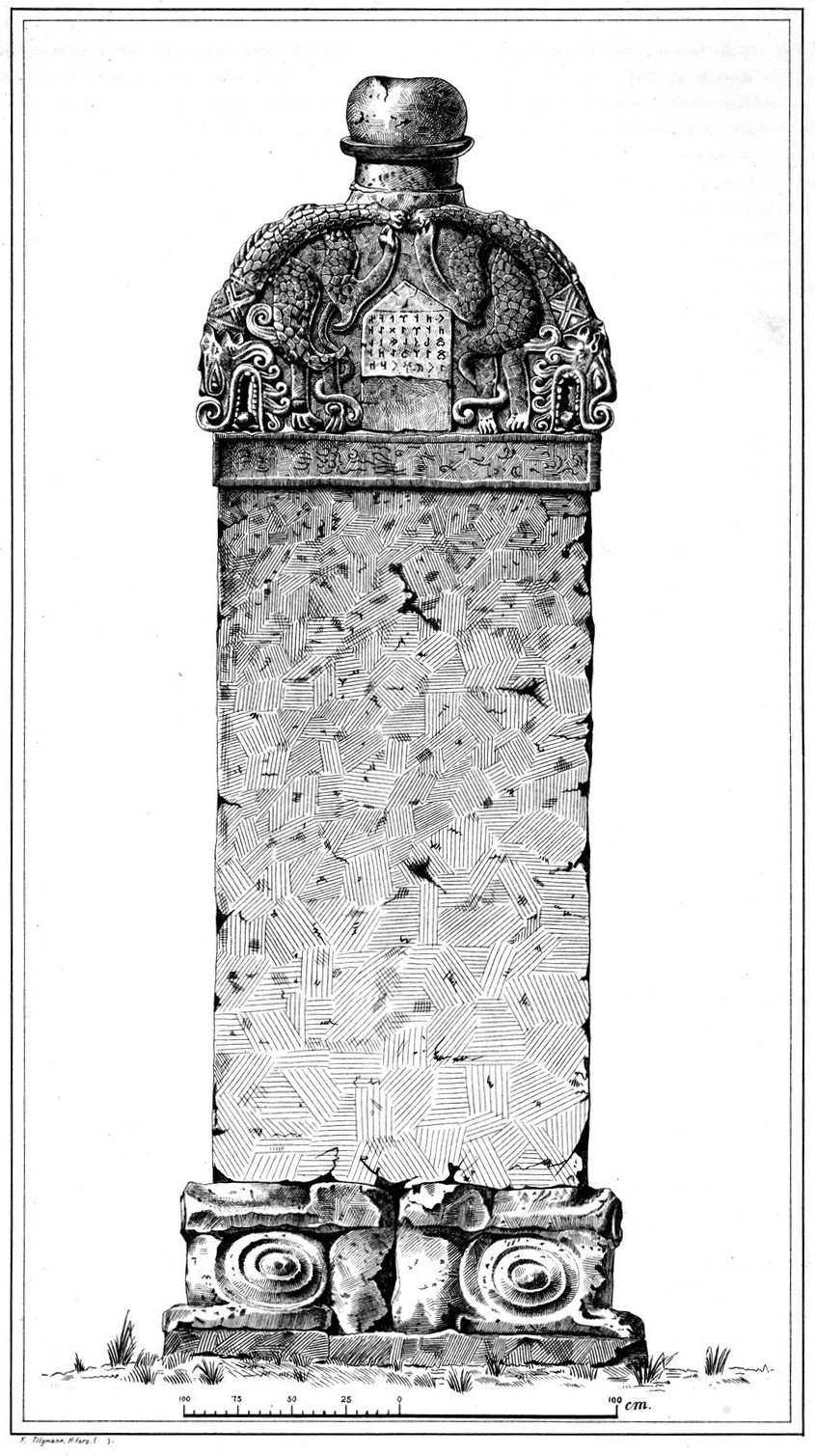
Reconstruction of the stele by Ivar Heikel, 1892 plate III

Karabalgasun inscription is a 9th century trilingual inscription located in Karabalgasun, the historical capital of the first Uyghur Khaganate, in Mongolia. The stele bearing the inscription is believed to have been erected during the reign of the eighth Uyghur ruler, Baoyi Qaghan (r. 808–821). Written in Old Uyghur, Sogdian, and Chinese, the inscription marks the Qaghan's military accomplishments and those of his predecessors, as well as their adoption and support of the Manichean religion.

The fragments of the inscription were first discovered by the Russian explorer Nikolai Yadrintsev in 1889.

== Context ==
The first line of the stele, which is copied in the shield-shaped tablet on top, names the qaghan to whom it was dedicated:

Old Uyghur: bu tängrikän [ay] tängridä bulmïs alp bilgä qaγan [... bitidimiz]
[We have written] this [inscription in praise of] the god-like qaghan (by the name of) Ay Tängridä Qut Bulmïš Alp Bilgä.

Middle Chinese: 九姓迴鶻愛登里囉汨没蜜施合毗伽可汗聖文神武碑幷序 Jiu xing hui gu ai deng li luo gu mo mi shi he pi jia ke han sheng wen shen wu bei bing xu
Inscription accompanied by preface (in praise) of Ay Tängridä Qut Bulmïš Alp Bilgä Qaghan of the Uighurs consisting of nine tribes for his sacred scholarship and divine martial virtue.

Sogdian: ʾyny ʾʾy tnkry-δʾ xwtpwl-mys ʾl-p pyl-kʾ βγy ʾwyγwr xʾγ-ʾn γwβty-ʾkh ptsʾk np’x(š)[tw δʾrym]
[We have] written this monument(?) in praise of the lord, the Uighur Qaghan Ay Tängridä Qut Bulmïs (sic) Alp Bilgä.

This ruler was the eighth qaghan of the empire, and the inscription was established either during his reign or shortly after his death in 821. The wording of the first lines seem to indicate close parallel between the Sogdian and the Old Uyghur versions, from which the Chinese is independent.
