= Zhangxin Qaghan =

Qaghan of the Uyghurs
- Reign: 833–839
- Predecessor: Zhaoli Qaghan
- Successor: Qasar Qaghan
- Born: Yaoluoge Hu (藥羅葛胡)
- Died: 839
Regnal name
- Ay Tengride Qut Bolmish Alp Külüg Bilge Qaghan (𐰖:𐱅𐰭𐰼𐰃𐰓𐰀:𐰸𐰆𐱃:𐰉𐰆𐰞𐰢𐱁:𐰞𐰯:𐰚𐰇𐰠𐰏:𐰋𐰃𐰠𐰏𐰀:𐰴𐰍𐰣); Blessed at Moon God, Courageous, Glorious, Wise Qaghan
- House: Ädiz clan (by birth); Yaglakar clan (official)
- Father: Chongde Qaghan

Zhangxin Qaghan (Chinese: 彰信可汗; lit. 'Manifesting sincerity') or Alp Külüg Bilge Qaghan was the eleventh ruler of Uyghurs. His personal name was Yaoluoge Hu (藥羅葛胡). He succeeded his uncle Zhaoli Qaghan in 833.

== Reign ==
Chinese records state that he sent an embassy led by Princess Taihe to the Tang, accompanied with seven women horse-archers and two Shatuo captives on 16 June 835.

His peaceful policy with China made him an unpopular ruler. This led to a rebellion in 839 by the Sogdian official An Yunhe (安允合) and Uyghur minister Chai Lei (柴勒). Qaghan was able to defeat and kill them, but lost a subsequent battle against another Uyghur official, General Jueluowu (掘羅勿) along with the Shatuo chief Zhuye Chixin. Zhangxin killed himself following the battle. He was succeeded by Qasar Qaghan.
