= Baoyi Qaghan =

Uyghur leader

Qaghan of the Uyghurs
- Reign: 808–821
- Predecessor: Qutluq II
- Successor: Chongde Qaghan
- Died: 821
- Spouse: Princess Yong'an (永安公主)
- Issue: Chongde Qaghan
Regnal name
- Ay Tengride Qut Bolmish Alp Bilge Qaghan (𐰖:𐱅𐰭𐰼𐰃𐰓𐰀:𐰸𐰆𐱃:𐰉𐰆𐰞𐰢𐱁:𐰞𐰯:𐰋𐰃𐰠𐰏𐰀:𐰴𐰍𐰣); Blessed at Moon God, Courageous, Wise Qaghan
- House: Ädiz clan (by birth); Yaglakar clan (official)
- Father: Qutluq II

Baoyi Qaghan, or Alp Bilge Qaghan, was the eighth ruler of the Uyghurs. His personal name is not known; therefore, he is often referred to by his Tang dynasty invested title, Baoyi (Chinese: 保義可汗; lit. 'Protecting righteousness'), which was invested on 22 June 808.

== Reign ==
His personal name Baoyi in Chinese might be the translation of the Old Turkic name 'Boy'. He was known as a zealous Manichean and militarily active ruler. He demanded a Chinese princess from Emperor Xianzong of Tang by sending his minister Inanchu Külüg Chigshi on 24 June 810, but the request was refused. Xianzong's reason was the expenses involved. Xianzong asked Manichean priests to pursue Baoyi and drop the request. Baoyi used this opportunity to occupy Tiquan (鵜泉) in April 813. Xianzong's minister of rites, Li Jiang, suspected that Baoyi would make peace with the Tibetan Empire to invade China. He suggested that Baoyi's proposal to marry a Tang princess should be accepted to further affirm the alliance between the Tang and Uyghurs. This suggestion was not accepted.

His request was only realized when he sent Ulu Tarkhan (Hedagan 合達干) to Emperor Muzong, who married off his sister Princess Yong'an (永安公主) in 821. Baoyi died after marriage. He was succeeded by his son Chongde Qaghan.

== Family ==
He had at least 4 sons:

1. Chongde Qaghan
2. Zhaoli Qaghan
3. Wujie Qaghan
4. Enian Qaghan

== Legacy ==
He commissioned the trilingual (Chinese, Old Turkic, Sogdian) Karabalgasun inscription in Ordu-Baliq.
