= Li Sizhong =

Li Sizhong (李思忠), né Wamosi (嗢沒斯), formally the Prince of Huaihua (懷化王), was a general of the Chinese Tang dynasty of Uyghur ancestry, who submitted to Emperor Wuzong after the collapse of the Uyghur Khaganate in 840 and subsequently served the Tang imperial government.

== Name ==
Wamosi's Old Uyghur name is reconstructed as Ormïzt, which transcribed Sogdian wrmzt "Ormuzd", ultimately derived from Ahura Mazda "Lord of Wisdom", the chief creator god of Zoroastrianism.

== Background ==
Little is known about Wamosi's early years, and it is not known when he was born. The earliest reference to him in Chinese historical sources, was in 840, during the reign of the Tang dynasty's Emperor Wuzong. That year, Yenisei Kyrgyz forces, under the Kyrgyz khan Are (阿熱), defeated and killed Qasar Qaghan of the Uyghur Khaganate's and their chancellor Jueluowu (掘羅勿). The Uyghur people scattered; some fled to the Karluks; some fled to the Tibetan Empire; and some fled to Anxi (安西, in modern Aksu Prefecture, Xinjiang). Some of the Uyghurs, led by Wamosi—who was said to be a brother of a qaghan (and the modern historian Bo Yang believed that he was Qasar Qaghan's brother), along with the chancellors Chixin (赤心), Pugu (僕固), and the noble Najiachuo (那頡啜; *Nağïd Čur), arrived at the Tang border city of Tiande (天德軍, in modern Bayan Nur, Inner Mongolia). They traded for food with other non-Han tribesmen, while seeking protection from the Tang.

== Submission to Tang ==
In the spring of 841, another group of Uyghur remnants had supported another noble, to be the new leader as Wujie Qaghan. The defender of Tiande, Tian Mou (田牟) and eunuch monitor Wei Zhongping (韋仲平), wanting to crush Wamosi's group of Uyghurs to claim it as their achievement, thus claimed that Wamosi was a Uyghur rebel and, based on the past alliance between the Tang and Uyghurs, should be attacked. Most imperial officials agreed, but the lead chancellor, Li Deyu, pointing out that Wamosi had fled to the Tang borders long before Wujie claimed the title of qaghan, argued that Wamosi was not a rebel. He advocated accepting Wamosi's submission. Emperor Wuzong, while not immediately doing so, ordered Tian not to provoke the Uyghurs, while ordering the armies of Hedong (河東, headquartered in modern Taiyuan, Shanxi) and Zhenwu (振武, headquartered in modern Hohhot, Inner Mongolia, which Tiande was part of) Circuits to mobilize to prepare to respond if the Uyghur army attacked.

In the spring of 842, Wamosi believed that Chixin would not be obedient to him, and therefore falsely informed Tian that Chixin was planning to attack Tiande. Tian responded by luring Chixin and Pugu into a trap and killing them. Najiachuo took some of the Uyghur remnants and fled east. With various Uyghur remnant groups, including the group under Wujie Qaghan, pillaging the northern Tang regions, Li Deyu advocated for accepting Wamosi's submission, to encourage other Uyghur nobles to submit. As a result, in the summer of 842, Wamosi was allowed to submit along with 2,200 other nobles. Wamosi was given a general title and was made the Prince of Huaihua.

== Service to Tang ==
Wujie Qaghan continued to pillage the Tang border regions, and demanded that the Tang surrender Wamosi to him, a demand that Emperor Wuzong rejected. Meanwhile, Wamosi went to the Tang capital Chang'an to pay homage to Wuzong. Thereafter, Wuzong gave his army the name of Guiyi Army (歸義軍, i.e., "the army that submitted to righteousness") and made him the commander of the Guiyi Army. Apparently to further assure Wuzong of his faithfulness, Wamosi requested that his family members be kept at Hedong's capital Taiyuan Municipality and that he and his brothers be posted to the borders to help defend the Tang. Wuzong ordered that the military governor (jiedushi) of Hedong, Liu Mian (劉沔), to treat Wamosi's family with kindness. He also bestowed the Tang imperial clan name of Li on Wamosi and changed his name to Li Sizhong. (Wamosi's brothers Alizhi (阿歷支), Xiwuchuo (習勿啜), and Wuluosi (烏羅思) were given the names of Li Sizhen (李思貞), Li Siyi (李思義), and Li Sili (李思禮), respectively.)

In the fall of 842, with Wujie and other Uyghur remnants still posing threats, Emperor Wuzong ordered Liu, Li Sizhong, and Zhang Zhongwu the military governor of Lulong Circuit (盧龍, headquartered in modern Beijing), to rendezvous at Taiyuan to prepare for further operations. Li Sizhong subsequently volunteered to fight the Uyghur remnants along with soldiers from the Qibi (契苾), Shatuo, and Tuyuhun tribesmen; in response, Wuzong ordered two prefects, He Qingchao (何清朝) and Qibi Tong (契苾通), to report to him. When, subsequently, in the winter of 842, Liu and Zhang requested a delay in the operations, but Li Zhongshun (李忠順) the military governor of Zhenwu requested that Li Sizhong attack the Uyghurs with him, Wuzong sent Li Sizhong to prepare for such an operation. (It is unclear, however, whether the operation was actually launched.)

In the spring of 843, Li Sizhong went to Chang'an to again pay homage to Emperor Wuzong. Believing that the Tang border generals were suspicious of him, he requested that he, his brothers, as well as his ally, the noble Ai Hongshun (愛弘順), all be transferred to Chang'an. Wuzong agreed. Subsequently, the Guiyi Army was disbanded, with the Uyghur soldiers being dispersed to various circuits. That was the last reference to Li Sizhong in Chinese historical records, and the date of his death is unknown.

== Notes and references ==
- New Book of Tang, vol. 217, part 2.
- Zizhi Tongjian, vols, 246, 247.
