= Zhaoli Qaghan =

Qaghan of the Uyghurs
- Reign: 824–833
- Predecessor: Chongde Qaghan
- Successor: Zhangxin Qaghan
- Born: Yaoluoge Hesa (藥羅葛曷薩)
- Died: 833
Regnal name
- Ay Tengride Qut Bolmish Alp Bilge Qaghan (𐰖:𐱅𐰭𐰼𐰃𐰓𐰀:𐰸𐰆𐱃:𐰉𐰆𐰞𐰢𐱁:𐰞𐰯:𐰋𐰃𐰠𐰏𐰀:𐰴𐰍𐰣); Blessed at Moon God, Courageous, Wise Qaghan
- House: Ädiz clan (by birth); Yaglakar clan (official)
- Father: Baoyi Qaghan

Zhaoli Qaghan (昭禮可汗) was the tenth ruler of the Uyghur Khaganate. His personal name was recorded as Yaoluoge Hesa (藥羅葛曷薩) in Chinese sources. His Uyghur name could be Qasar or Xazar.

== Biography ==
=== Background ===
Zhaoli Qaghan was a younger brother of Chongde Qaghan and a son of Baoyi Qaghan. He was a tegin during his brother's and father's reign and styled as Hesa Teqin (曷薩特勤) (Note: erroneously transcribed in manuscript as 曷薩特勒 Hesa Tele, writing 勒 le instead of 勤 qin being a common script error in Chinese dynastic histories). He succeeded his brother in 824.

=== Reign ===
Upon his enthronement, he received 12 chariots as a gift and 500,000 pieces of silk as a trade for horses from Emperor Wenzong of Tang. He received additional tribute of 200,000 pieces of silk in 827. Another tribute was recorded in 829. He was murdered in early 833 by his ministers, who made his nephew Hu Tegin succeed him as Zhangxin Qaghan. There was a mourning ceremony in Chang'an on 20 April 833.
