= Chongde Qaghan =

Qaghan of the Uyghurs
- Reign: 821–824
- Predecessor: Baoyi Qaghan
- Successor: Zhaoli Qaghan
- Died: 824
- Spouse: Princess Taihe (太和公主)
Regnal name
- Kün Tengride Ulugh Bolmish Küçlüg Bilge Qaghan (𐰚𐰇𐰤:𐱅𐰭𐰼𐰃𐰓𐰀:𐰆𐰍𐰞:𐰉𐰆𐰞𐰢𐱁:𐰚𐰇𐰲𐰠𐰏:𐰋𐰃𐰠𐰏𐰀:𐰴𐰍𐰣); Great-born at Sun God, Powerful, Wise Qaghan
- House: Ädiz clan (by birth); Yaglakar clan (official)
- Father: Baoyi Qaghan

Chongde Qaghan or Küçlüg Bilge Qaghan was the ninth ruler of Uyghurs. His personal name is not known and is often referred by his Tang dynasty invested title Chongde (Chinese: 崇德可汗; literally: 'Honoring virtue') which was invested on 26 May 821.

== Reign ==
Upon Chongde Qaghan's accession, he sent a delegation including a number of officials and two Uyghur princesses, along with a bride price of horses and camels to Emperor Muzong of Tang to seek a Tang Princess. Muzong agreed and sent Princess Taihe with a grand delegation. She was escorted by the general Hu Zheng (胡証), assisted by fellow officials Li Xian (李憲) and Yin You (殷侑). They did not arrive at the Uyghur capital until 822. Princess Taihe was later made Renxiao Duanli Mingzhi Shangshou Khatun (人小椴黎明之上首可敦) by Muzong.

After his marriage he was visited by the Muslim traveller Tamim ibn Bahr. According to Tamim's notes, he had a personal army of 12,000 with 17 subordinates each having 13,000 soldiers.

He died in 824 and was succeeded by his brother Zhaoli Qaghan.

== Family ==
He had at least 5 sons:

1. Zhangxin Qaghan
2. Womosi Tegin (submitted to Tang China)
3. Alizhi (阿歷支) (submitted to Tang China)
4. Xiwuchuo (習勿啜) (submitted to Tang China)
5. Wuluosi (烏羅思) (submitted to Tang China)
