= Qasar Qaghan =

Qaghan of the Uyghurs
- Reign: 839–840
- Predecessor: Zhangxin Qaghan
- Successor: Wujie Qaghan
- Died: 840

Qasar Qaghan (Chinese: 㕎馺可汗) was the twelfth qaghan of Uyghurs.

== Reign ==
According to Japanese researcher Haneda Toru (羽田亨) Qasar Qaghan was the same person as Uyghur general Jueluowu (掘羅勿) who rebelled against Zhangxin Qaghan. However, according to Michael Drompp, Qasar was a puppet ruler who was raised to the throne by Jueluowu. In any case his reign was very brief. Against the usurpation, Uyghur general Külüg Bagha (Chinese: 句禄莫和; pinyin: Jùlù Mòhé) fled to the Kyrgyz Khaganate and appealed for help. The war, a major plague and a major snow storm, killed many of the Uyghur's livestock and led to the Uyghur Khaganate's sudden decline. Using this as an opportunity, Külüg Bagha and 100,000 Kyrgyz invaded Ordu-Baliq and burned the city. Qasar and Jueluowu were killed by a Kyrgyz leader titled Ā-rè (阿熱; Middle Chinese: /ʔɑ-ȵiᴇt̚/ < *Änäl, phonetic variant of Old Turkic İnäl), who would take the title of qaghan.

== Aftermath ==
Following Kyrgyz sack of capital, Uyghur minister Sazhi (馺职) and Pang Tegin (庞特勒) together with fifteen clans went to the Karluk Yabghu for refuge. Another group of refugees fled with Uyghur prince Wamosi to Tang China. A remnant group continued to claim statehood under leadership of Wujie Qaghan.
