= Li Rangyi =

Li Rangyi (李讓夷; died 847?), courtesy name Daxin (達心), was an official of the Chinese Tang dynasty, serving as a chancellor during the reigns of Emperor Wuzong and (briefly) Emperor Wuzong's uncle Emperor Xuānzong.

== Background and early career ==
It is not known when Li Rangyi was born, and his family background was not clearly stated in traditional historical accounts other than that, according to his biographies in the Old Book of Tang and the New Book of Tang, his family was from the Li clan of Longxi (隴西, in modern Tianshui, Gansu)—although the New Book of Tang did not list him among the chancellors from the Longxi Li clan. His grandfather was named Li Yue (李悅) and his father was named Li Yinggui (李應規), although, if they carried any official titles, those titles were lost to history. According to the tombstone of the Buddhist nun Li Shencai (李勝才; unearthed in 2004), which indicated that Li Rangyi was her older brother, the family was from another prominent Li clan, of Zhao Commandery (趙郡, in modern Shijiazhuang, Hebei), but further based on that assertion and other parts of the epitaph, the researchers Cheng Yi (程义), Xiao Jianyi (肖健一), and Wang Weikun (王维坤) concluded that Li Rangyi's family was not prominent and was not from either the Longxi or the Zhao Li clan.

Li Rangyi passed the imperial examinations in the Jinshi class in 819, during the reign of Emperor Xianzong. He thereafter served on staffs of regional governors.

== During Emperor Wenzong's reign ==
Early in the Taihe era (827–835) of Emperor Xianzong's grandson Emperor Wenzong, Li Rangyi was recalled to the Tang capital Chang'an to serve as You Shiyi (右拾遺), a low-level advisory official at the legislative bureau of government (中書省, Zhongshu Sheng). Thereafter, he was promoted to be Zuo Bujue (左補闕), a slightly-higher-ranked advisory official at the examination bureau (門下省, Menxia Sheng) and made an imperial scholar (翰林學士, Hanlin Xueshi). In 829, he was made Zhifang Yuanwailang (職方員外郎), a low-level official at the ministry of defense (兵部, Bingbu), and then Zuosi Langzhong (左司郎中), a supervisory official under one of the secretaries general of the executive bureau (尚書省, Shangshu Sheng), while continuing to serve as imperial scholar. In 835, he was made Jianyi Daifu (諫議大夫), a high-level advisory official.

In 836, Li Rangyi, in addition to his other posts, was also made a supervisory imperial chronicler (起居舍人, Qiju Sheren)—but his commission came after a dispute between the chancellors. His predecessor as Qiju Sheren, Li Bao (李褒), had suffered from chronic illness and requested to resign. When the chancellor Li Shi reported this to Emperor Wenzong, Emperor Wenzong pointed out that the early Tang chancellor Chu Suiliang had served as both Jianyi Daifu and Qiju Sheren at one point, and that he believed that one of the Jianyi Daifu could do so. He requested that Li Shi submit the list of the current Jianyi Daifu; Li Shi submitted the names of Li Rangyi, Feng Ding (馮定), Sun Jian (孫簡), and Xiao Chu (蕭俶). Emperor Wenzong indicated that Li Rangyi was acceptable to him, but another chancellor, Li Guyan, recommended Cui Qiu (崔球) and Zhang Cizong (張次宗). Yet another chancellor, Zheng Tan, then spoke against Cui, arguing that Cui had improperly associated with the former chancellor Li Zongmin, and further stated that he would have no objections whatsoever if Emperor Wenzong selected Li Rangyi or Pei Zhongru (裴中孺). In 837, Li Rangyi was made Zhongshu Sheren (中書舍人), a mid-level official of the legislative bureau. However, because of the 836 controversy, subsequently, after Li Zongmin's allies Yang Sifu and Li Jue became chancellors, Li Rangyi would not again be promoted for the rest of Emperor Wenzong's reign.

== During Emperor Wuzong's reign ==
After Emperor Wenzong died in 841 and was succeeded by his brother Emperor Wuzong, Li Deyu became the leading chancellor, and Li Deyu had Li Rangyi promoted repeatedly—as deputy minister of public works (工部侍郎, Gongbu Shilang), deputy minister of census (戶部侍郎, Hubu Shilang), and then one of the secretaries general (尚書左丞, Shangshu Zuocheng, or 尚書右丞, Shangshu Youcheng) of the executive bureau of government (尚書省, Shangshu Sheng). In 842, he was made Zhongshu Shilang (中書侍郎), the deputy head of the legislative bureau (中書省, Zhongshu Sheng) and chancellor de facto with the designation Tong Zhongshu Menxia Pingzhangshi (同中書門下平章事).

== During Emperor Xuānzong's reign ==
After Emperor Wuzong died in 846 and was succeeded by his uncle Emperor Xuānzong, Li Rangyi was given the title of Sikong (司空, one of the Three Excellencies) and put in charge of overseeing construction of Emperor Wuzong's tomb. Soon thereafter, Li Deyu lost power, and both he and Li Rangyi were removed from their chancellor posts. Li Rangyi, even before the tomb was complete, was made the military governor (jiedushi) of Huainan Circuit (淮南, headquartered in modern Yangzhou, Jiangsu). He soon grew ill and requested a return to Chang'an, and he died on the way back to Chang'an. He was given posthumous honors.

It was said that Li Rangyi was frugal and did not make improper associations, and was praised for it.

== Notes and references ==
- Old Book of Tang, vol. 176.
- New Book of Tang, vol. 181.
- Zizhi Tongjian, vols. 246, 248.
