= Chen Yixing =

Chinese historian, military general, and politician (died 844)

Chen Yixing (陳夷行) (died 844), courtesy name Zhoudao (周道), was a Chinese historian, military general, and politician during the Tang dynasty, serving twice as a chancellor during the reigns of Emperor Wenzong and Emperor Wuzong. He was viewed as a Li Faction leader in the Niu-Li Factional Struggles.

== Background and early career ==
It is not known when Chen Yixing was born. It was said that his family had its origins south of the Yangtze River, but had, for generations, lived in Yingchuan (潁川). Neither his grandfather Chen Zhong (陳忠) nor his father Chen Yong (陳邕) was listed with any offices in the table of the chancellors' family trees in the New Book of Tang, suggesting that neither had an official title. He had at least three younger brothers, Chen Xuanxi (陳玄錫), Chen Yize (陳夷則), and Chen Yishi (陳夷實).

In 812, during the reign of Emperor Xianzong, Chen passed the imperial examinations in the Jinshi class. Thereafter, he served on the staffs of several regional governors. As of the end of Baoli era (825–827) of Emperor Xianzong's grandson Emperor Jingzong, Chen was serving as an imperial censor with the title of Shiyushi (侍御史), and serving at the eastern capital Luoyang, when he was made Yubu Yuanwailang (虞部員外郎), a low-level official at the ministry of public works (工部, Gongbu). He continued to serve at Luoyang.

== During Emperor Wenzong's reign ==
=== Before chancellorship ===
In 829, during the reign of Emperor Jingzong's brother Emperor Wenzong, Chen Yixing was recalled to the capital Chang'an to serve as an imperial chronicler (起居郎, Qijulang), and he also served as an editor in imperial history, participating in the compilation of the chronicles of Emperor Xianzong's reign. After those chronicles of Emperor Xianzong's reigns were presented to Emperor Wenzong in 830, Chen was made Sifeng Yuanwailang (司封員外郎), a low-level official at the ministry of civil service affairs (吏部, Libu). In 831, he was promoted to be Libu Langzhong (吏部郎中), a supervisory official at the ministry of civil service affairs. Later in the same year, he was also made an imperial scholar (翰林學士, Hanlin Xueshi). In 834, he was also made a tutor to the Crown Prince Li Yong and ordered to attend to and lecture Li Yong on the Confucian classics once every five days. He was further given the office of Jianyi Daifu (諫議大夫), an advisory official, and put in charge of drafting edicts. In 835, he was made the deputy minister of worship (太常少卿, Taichang Shaoqing), and continued to serve in his capacities as imperial scholar, tutor to Li Yong, and drafter of edicts.

=== During and after chancellorship ===
In 837, when Chen Yixing was also serving as the deputy minister of public works (工部侍郎, Gongbu Shilang), he was made a chancellor de facto with the designation Tong Zhongshu Menxia Pingzhangshi (同中書門下平章事), serving alongside Li Shi and Zheng Tan. As of 838, by which time Li Shi had resigned and Yang Sifu and Li Jue had been made chancellors as well, it was said that Chen was honest in his opinions and therefore despised Yang for what he viewed as Yang's grab on power, and they often argued when discussing policy matters. Chen thus offered to resign, but Emperor Wenzong declined his resignation. After this incident, he continued to frequently, in veiled terms, accuse Yang of stealing imperial authority while discussing issues. (Modern historians such as Bo Yang viewed these arguments as factional in nature, and considered Chen and Zheng to be among the leaders of the Li Faction in the Niu-Li Factional Struggles (named after Li Deyu), while viewing Yang and Li Jue to be among the leaders of the Niu Faction (named after Niu Sengru). In particular, later in 838, when Yang advocated for the former chancellor Li Zongmin, also considered a Niu Faction leader, who had been exiled, promoted and moved closer to the capital, Chen opposed vehemently, and it was said that from this point on, all policy arguments were complicated by partisan issues, making it difficult for Emperor Wenzong to rule on them.

In 839, there was a major argument that led to the removals of Chen and Zheng. Emperor Wenzong had praised the talents of the acting director of finances, Du Cong. Yang and Li Jue thereafter recommended Du to be the ministry of census. Chen responded, "Such orders should come from the Emperor. In the past, those who lost stately sovereignty did so by losing their authorities to their subjects." Li Jue responded, "Your Imperial Majesty had told me previously that an Emperor should select chancellors, not suspect them." In a subsequent discussion, Chen again emphasized that the Emperor should not yield authority to his subjects. Li Jue, offended, responded, "Chen Yixing is obviously suspecting that there are chancellors who are stealing power from Your Imperial Majesty. I have often requested retirement, and I would be fortunate to be given a post as an imperial prince's teacher." Zheng then stated, "Your Imperial Majesty ruled well in the first and second years of the Kaicheng era [(i.e., 836 and 837)], while less so in the third and fourth years of Kaicheng [(i.e., 838 and 839)]." Yang responded, "In the first and second years, Zheng Tan and Chen Yixing were in power. In the third and fourth years, your subject and Li Jue joined them. Of course, the crime is mine." He then stated, "I do not dare to again enter the Office of the Chancellors!" He withdrew from Emperor Wenzong's presence. Emperor Wenzong subsequently sent a eunuch to comfort him, and Zheng partially apologized, stating, "Your subject is foolish. I did not intend to point at Yang Sifu, but Yang Sifu's reaction shows that he has no tolerance for me." Yang responded, "Zheng Tan stated that the governance is deteriorating year by year. This does not only incriminate your subject, but also speaks ill of your holy virtues." Yang then submitted multiple offers to resign. Soon thereafter, Zheng and Chen were stripped of their chancellor posts. Chen, instead, was made the deputy minister of civil service affairs (吏部侍郎, Libu Shilang). Later in the year, he was sent out of the capital to serve as the prefect of Hua Prefecture (華州, in modern Weinan, Shaanxi).

== During Emperor Wuzong's reign ==
In 841, by which time Emperor Wenzong's brother Emperor Wuzong was emperor and Li Deyu was the leading chancellor, Chen Yixing was recalled from Hua Prefecture, apparently first to serve as chief imperial censor (御史大夫, Yushi Daifu), and then again chancellor, as well Menxia Shilang (門下侍郎), the deputy head of the examination bureau of government (門下省, Menxia Sheng).

Later that year, there was an incident in which Emperor Wuzong, believing that Yang Sifu and Li Jue, whom he had stripped of chancellor posts and sent out of Chang'an because he believed that they did not support him as emperor, became further incensed by the powerful eunuch Qiu Shiliang against Yang and Li Jue, as well as two eunuchs trusted by Emperor Wenzong — Liu Hongyi (劉弘逸) and Xue Jileng (薛季稜) — that he ordered Liu and Xue to commit suicide, and further sent eunuchs with orders to force Yang and Li Jue to commit suicide as well. After Du Cong pointed out to Li Deyu that it was unwise to let Emperor Wuzong to be accustomed to kill officials, Li Deyu, Chen, and fellow chancellors Cui Gong and Cui Dan interceded. As a result, Yang and Li Jue were spared of their lives, but further demoted.

Chen was himself soon involved in a policy argument against Li Deyu, as Tang's long-time ally and vassal the Uyghur Empire had recently been defeated by Xiajiasi, and displaced Uyghurs were raiding along the Tang border. One major group of the Uyghurs, led by the noble Wamosi, approached the Tang city of Tiande (天德, in modern Bayan Nur, Inner Mongolia) and sought food, offering to submit to Tang. The defender of Tiande, Tian Mou (田牟), suggested that Wamosi's offer be rejected and that Tang forces attack him, along with allied Tuyuhun, Shatuo, and Dangxiang tribes. Li Deyu opined differently, believing that Wamosi's offer should be accepted and that food should be supplied to the Uyghurs. Chen opposed Li Deyu, arguing that in effect, it would be aiding the enemy. Emperor Wuzong eventually agreed with Li Deyu.

In 842, after Wamosi had made a trip to Chang'an to pay homage to Emperor Wuzong, Chen was relieved of his chancellor post and made Zuo Pushe (左僕射), one of the heads of the executive bureau (尚書省, Shangshu Sheng). In 843, Chen was sent out of the capital to serve as the military governor (Jiedushi) of Hezhong Circuit (河中, headquartered in modern Yuncheng, Shanxi), as well as the mayor of its capital Hezhong Municipality. He was also given the honorary title of acting Sikong (司空, one of the Three Excellencies) and Tong Zhongshu Menxia Pingzhangshi. Troops under him subsequently participated in the campaign against the warlord Liu Zhen, which Li Deyu was overseeing. He died in 844 and was given posthumous honors.

== Notes and references ==
- Old Book of Tang, vol. 173.
- New Book of Tang, vol. 181.
- Zizhi Tongjian, vols. 245, 246, 247.
