= Du Cong =

Du Cong (杜悰, c. 794?–873?), courtesy name Yongyu (永裕), formally the Duke of Bin (邠公) was an official of the Tang dynasty of China, serving two terms as chancellor during the reigns of Emperor Wuzong and Emperor Wuzong's cousin Emperor Yizong. He was traditionally considered a skilled politician who maintained his high position throughout his lengthy career, but not a capable chancellor.

== Background and early career ==
Du Cong came from a prominent aristocratic family, with his grandfather Du You having served as a chancellor during the reigns of Emperor Dezong, Emperor Dezong's son Emperor Shunzong, and Emperor Shunzong's son Emperor Xianzong. Du Cong's father Du Shifang (杜式方) was Du You's second son, and served several terms as minister or regional governor. The famed poet Du Mu was his cousin (son of Du Shifang's brother Du Congyu (杜從郁)).

Because Du Cong's heritage, he entered civil service early, and as his third assignment he served as a staff member of the Crown Prince. When the imperial scholar Dugu Yu (獨孤郁) offered to resign because his father-in-law Quan Deyu had just been made chancellor, Emperor Xianzong, who was impressed with Dugu's talent, stated, "How is it that Quan Deyu gets a son-in-law like Dugu Yu and I do not?" Therefore, for his own daughters, he turned away from the tradition of selecting their husbands from the households of the nobles and the accomplished generals, instead requesting the officials in charge to select their husbands from scholarly officials whose sons had literary talents. Most of the candidates declined, but Du Cong did not. In 814, Emperor Xianzong therefore had him marry Emperor Xianzong's daughter Princess Qiyang, the oldest daughter of Emperor Xianzong's wife Consort Guo. It was said that Princess Qiyang was humble, unlike many princesses of the day, and, to avoid a situation where her servants would look down on the Du household, she declined to take them with her. Little was known about Du's career the rest of Emperor Xianzong's reign, or the reigns of his son Emperor Muzong and Emperor Muzong's son Emperor Jingzong, other than that he eventually became minister of agriculture (司農卿, Sinong Qing).

== During Emperor Wenzong's reign ==
In 832, during the reign of Emperor Jingzong's younger brother Emperor Wenzong, Du Cong was made the mayor of Jingzhao Municipality (京兆, i.e., the region of the Tang capital Chang'an). At that time, he was considered a close associate of the chancellor Li Zongmin, a leader of the faction later known as the Niu Faction (named after Li Zongmin's ally Niu Sengru) in the Niu-Li Factional Struggles. He tried to broker a peace between Li Zongmin and Li Deyu, a leader of the rival Li Faction (after whom the Li Faction was named), by suggesting that Li Zongmin offer to recommend Li Deyu to oversee the imperial examinations. Li Zongmin rejected the idea, but agreed to Du's alternate proposal of recommending Li Deyu as chief imperial censor; Li Deyu was pleased, but when Li Zongmin subsequently reneged, the possibility of peace between Li Zongmin and Li Deyu was broken.

In 833, Du was sent out of Chang'an to serve as the military governor (jiedushi) of Fengxiang Circuit (鳳翔, headquartered in modern Baoji, Shaanxi), as well as the mayor of its capital Fengxiang Municipality. Thereafter, he briefly left government service to observe a mourning period when his mother died. In 834, he was recalled to government service as the military governor of Zhongwu Circuit (忠武, headquartered in Xuchang, Henan). In 835, there was a time when Emperor Wenzong was set to replace him with the general Li Ting (李聽), but Li Ting's commission was cancelled when Emperor Wenzong's close associate Zheng Zhu falsely accused Li Ting of corruption, and Du thus remained at Zhongwu.

Around the new year 838, Du was recalled to Chang'an to serve as the minister of public works (工部尚書, Gongbu Shangshu) and acting director of finances. At that time, Princess Qiyang died; as a result of observing a mourning period for her—as it was customary for princesses' husbands to observe a three-year mourning period for them, although that was not required of ordinary widowers—he did not meet Emperor Wenzong to thank him for the commission, which surprised Emperor Wenzong. The chancellor Li Jue explained the reason why Du was not meeting him and commented, "This is half of the reason why prominent clans' members do not want to engage in marriages with the imperial household." Emperor Wenzong commented that he did not know of this custom, and subsequently issued an edict abolishing it. In 838, Du was made minister of census (戶部尚書, Hubu Shanshu) and continued to act as the director of finances.

== During Emperor Wuzong's reign ==
Emperor Wenzong died in 840 and was succeeded by his younger brother Emperor Wuzong, supported by the powerful eunuchs Qiu Shiliang and Yu Hongzhi (魚弘志), against the wishes of the chancellors Li Jue and Yang Sifu. Therefore, after Emperor Wuzong took the throne, he had Yang and Li Jue removed from their chancellor positions and sent out of the capital. In 841, after further accusations by Qiu against Yang, Li Jue, as well as two eunuchs that Emperor Wenzong had favored, Liu Hongyi (劉弘逸) and Xue Jileng (薛季稜), Emperor Wuzong ordered Liu and Xue to commit suicide, and sent messengers to Tang Prefecture (潭州, in modern Changsha, Hunan), where Yang was serving as the governor of Hunan Circuit (湖南), and Gui Prefecture (桂州, in modern Guilin, Guangxi), where Li Jue was serving as the governor of Gui District (桂管), to order Yang and Li Jue to commit suicide as well. When Du Cong heard of this, he met Li Deyu (who had become the lead chancellor by this point) and warned Li Deyu that Emperor Wuzong, being still a young emperor, should not become accustomed to kill high-level officials. Li Deyu and his fellow chancellors Cui Gong, Cui Dan, and Chen Yixing thus interceded on Yang's and Li Jue's behalf. Emperor Wuzong relented and spared Yang's and Li Jue's lives, although they were further demoted.

As of 844, Du was serving as the military governor of Huainan Circuit (淮南, headquartered in modern Yangzhou, Jiangsu), when Emperor Wuzong issued an order to the eunuch monitor of Huainan Circuit that he should select 17 prostitutes who were capable in drinking games and send them to the palace. The eunuch monitor asked Du to be involved in the selection process, and further contemplated training regular women to learn the drinking games and then submitting them. Du refused to be involved. In anger, the eunuch monitor submitted an accusation against Du. When Emperor Wuzong received the report, however, he reconsidered and came to believe that his original order was inappropriate, and cancelled it. Later in the year, he recalled Du to serve as chancellor with the designation Tong Zhongshu Menxia Pingzhangshi (同中書門下平章事), and also to serve as the director of finances and the director of the salt and iron monopolies. When Du met with him to thank him, he praised Du and compared Du to the early Tang chancellor Wei Zheng. Later in the year, after the imperial campaign against the warlord Liu Zhen resulted in Liu's officer Guo Yi (郭誼) killing Liu and surrendering Liu's Zhaoyi Circuit (昭義, headquartered in modern Changzhi, Shanxi) to the imperial government, Li Deyu argued that Guo was treacherous and should be put to death as well. Emperor Wuzong agreed with Li Deyu. Du, pointing out that at that time the imperial treasury was exhausted, argued for Guo to be tolerated, thus drawing Emperor Wuzong's displeasure. In 845, he was thus removed from his chancellor post. He was soon sent out of the capital to serve as the military governor of Dongchuan Circuit (東川, headquartered in modern Mianyang, Sichuan), and later was transferred to Xichuan Circuit (西川, headquartered in modern Chengdu, Sichuan).

== During Emperor Xuānzong's reign ==
As of 849, by which time Emperor Wuzong had died and been succeeded by his uncle Emperor Xuānzong, Du Cong was at Xichuan. That year, with Tang's rival to the west Tufan in internal turmoil and various Tang circuit armies set out to recover territory that Tang had previously lost to Tufan, Du's Xichuan Circuit recovered Wei Prefecture (維州, in modern Ngawa Tibetan and Qiang Autonomous Prefecture, Sichuan).

Later, Du was transferred back to Huainan Circuit. In 855, Huainan was suffering from a severe famine, but it was said that Du was spending his time in feasting and gaming, not managing the famine relief. When Emperor Xuānzong received report of this, he sent the chancellor Cui Xuan to Huainan to serve as its military governor, and made Du a senior advisor to the Crown Prince, but with his office at the eastern capital Luoyang. A year or so later, he was made the defender of Luoyang. Sometime after, he was returned to Xichuan to serve as its military governor.

== During Emperor Yizong's reign ==
As of 861, by which time Emperor Xuānzong had died and been succeeded by his son Emperor Yizong, Du Cong was back at Chang'an and serving as Zuo Pushe (左僕射, one of the heads of the executive bureau of government (尚書省, Shangshu Sheng)) and the director of finances, when he was made Menxia Shilang (門下侍郎), the deputy head of the examination bureau (門下省, Menxia Sheng) and chancellor again with the designation Tong Zhongshu Menxia Pingzhangshi. It was said that there was a time when Emperor Yizong issued a secret order to him through the eunuch Yang Gongqing (楊公慶) that the other chancellors at the time, Bi Xian, Du Shenquan, and Jiang Shen should be punished for having failed to suggest Emperor Yizong's succession late in Emperor Xuānzong's reign. Du argued against it, pointing out to Yang and the other eunuchs that getting the emperor accustomed to killing would also hurt them in the future. As a result, nothing was eventually done against Bi, Du Shenquan, or Jiang. While serving as chancellor, he was also given the honorific title of Taifu (太傅) and created the Duke of Bin.

At that time, Tang was engaged in a war with Nanzhao over Tang's refusal to bestow imperial sanction on the succession of Nanzhao's new king Qiulong (酋龍) over Qiulong's name being violative of the naming taboo for Emperor Xuanzong (who was named Li Longji). Du suggested that new Tang emissaries be sent to Nanzhao to mourn the death of Qiulong's father Fengyou (豐祐) and inform Qiulong that as soon as he changed his name, Tang would sanction his succession. Emperor Yizong agreed, but before the emissaries could be sent, Nanzhao launched an attack on Xi Prefecture (巂州, in modern Liangshan Yi Autonomous Prefecture, Sichuan) and Qionglai Pass (邛崍關, in modern Ya'an, Sichuan), and so the mission was cancelled.

In 863, Du was sent out of Chang'an to serve as the military governor of Fengxiang, continuing to carry the Tong Zhongshu Menxia Pingzhangshi title as an honorary title. He was eventually transferred to Jingnan Circuit (荊南, headquartered in modern Jingzhou, Hubei). In 873, when Nanzhao attacked both Xichuan and Qianzhong Circuits (黔中, headquartered in modern Chongqing), the defender of Qianzhong, Qin Kuangmou (秦匡謀) had too weak of an army to defend against the Nanzhao attack, and he abandoned it and fled to Jingnan. Du arrested Qin and submitted an accusation against Qin. Emperor Yizong, in response, issued an edict ordering that Qin be executed and that his assets and family be forfeited. This was not a response that Du expected, and, in shock, he suffered an illness and died. He was given posthumous honors.

The traditional accounts of Du's career indicated that he was not talented—that while he served as general and chancellor, he only cared about protecting himself and did not advance the careers of talented people.

== Notes and references ==
- Old Book of Tang, vol. 147.
- New Book of Tang, vol. 166.
- Zizhi Tongjian, vols. 239, 244, 245, 246, 247, 248, 249, 250, 252.
