= Li Zongmin =

Chinese politician from the Tang Dynasty

Li Zongmin (李宗閔) (died 846?), courtesy name Sunzhi (損之), was a Chinese politician of the Tang dynasty, serving twice as chancellor during the reign of Emperor Wenzong. He was considered one of the leading figures of the Niu-Li Factional Struggles — factional struggles between two factions at the Tang court that lasted decades — as a leader of the so-called Niu Faction, named after his colleague Niu Sengru.

== Background ==
It is not known when Li Zongmin was born. His great-great-grandfather was Li Yuanyi (李元懿) the Prince of Zheng, a son of Tang dynasty's founding emperor Emperor Gaozu. His great-grandfather was Li Jing (李璥), who inherited the Prince of Zheng title from Li Yuanyi. His grandfather Li Chayan (李察言) was not listed with any offices while alive but was listed with a posthumous honor, while his father served as a supervisory official at the imperial government and as a prefectural prefect, and also carried the title of Duke of Chenliu. Li Zongmin's cousin Li Yijian served as a chancellor during the reign of Emperor Xianzong. Li Zongmin himself passed the imperial examinations in the Jinshi class in 805, during the reign of Emperor Xianzong's grandfather Emperor Dezong, in the same year as eventual colleague and ally Niu Sengru.

== During Emperor Xianzong's reign ==
In 808, at special imperial examinations where Emperor Xianzong ordered that low-level officials submit honest opinions about the government, several of the examinees — Li Zongmin, Niu Sengru, and Huangfu Shi (皇甫湜) stated, without using any veiled language, the issues they saw with the governance at the time. The officials that Emperor Xianzong put in charge of the examinations, Yang Yuling (楊於陵) and Wei Guanzhi ranked them high. However, the chancellor Li Jifu saw these as severe criticisms of himself, and, weeping, accused the reviewing officials, the imperial scholars Pei Ji and Wang Ya, of conflict of interest — as Huangfu was a nephew of Wang's. As a result of Li Jifu's accusations, Wang, Pei, Yang, and Wei were all demoted, and it was said that while no harm came to Li Zongmin, Niu, and Huangfu at that time, they were effectively stuck at the positions they previously served without promotion, — and it appeared that soon after the examination, Li Zongmin was made the sheriff of Luoyang County, one of the two counties making up the eastern capital Luoyang. As a result, they all sought positions as staff members of military governors.

It was only after Li Jifu's death in 814 that Li Zongmin began his service at the central government, as Jiancha Yushi (監察御史), a low-level imperial censor, and he was thereafter promoted to be Lǐbu Yuanwailang (禮部員外郎), a low-level official at the ministry of rites (禮部, Lǐbu). In 817, when the chancellor Pei Du went to the frontline to oversee the imperial campaign against the warlord Wu Yuanji and, as part of his responsibilities, was made the military governor (Jiedushi) of Zhangyi Circuit (彰義, headquartered in modern Zhumadian, Henan), which Wu then held, he had a large number of imperial officials serve on his staff, and he had Li Jifu serve as his secretary in his capacity as military governor; it was said that it was because of Li Zongmin's service under Pei that he later began to receive prominence. After the end of the campaign, Li Zongmin was made Jiabu Langzhong (駕部郎中), a supervisory official at the ministry of rites, and was also put in charge of drafting edicts.

== During Emperor Muzong's reign ==
After Emperor Xianzong died in 820 and was succeeded by his son Emperor Muzong, Li Zongmin was promoted to be Zhongshu Sheren (中書舍人), a mid-level official at the legislative bureau of government (中書省, Zhongshu Sheng). Meanwhile, at that time his father was also moved from being the ministry of imperial clan affairs (宗正卿) to be the prefect of Hua Prefecture (華州, in modern Weinan, Shaanxi), and their simultaneous commissions were considered to be an honor.

However, in 821, Li Zongmin would be involved in the incident that was said to precipitate the Niu-Li Factional Struggles. At that time, Li Jifu's son Li Deyu was an imperial scholar and was still resentful of Li Zongmin's criticism against his father, and both Li Deyu and Yuan Zhen, who was a Zhongshu Sheren colleague of Li Zongmin's, were both struggling with Li Zongmin for power. Meanwhile, Li Zongmin's junior colleague at the legislative bureau, Yang Rushi (楊汝士) and the deputy minister of rites (禮部侍郎, Lǐbu Shilang) Qian Hui (錢徽) were in charge of overseeing the imperial examinations. The military governor Duan Wenchang (a former chancellor) and the imperial scholar Li Shen both made secret pleas to Qian for certain examinees. However, when the results were announced, the examinees that Duan and Li Shen recommended were not given passing results, while among those passing the examinations were Zheng Lang, the brother of the examination bureau (門下省, Menxia Sheng) official Zheng Tan; Pei Zhuan (裴譔) the son of the military governor Pei Du (also a former chancellor); Li Zongmin's son-in-law Su Chao (蘇巢); and Yang Rushi's brother Yang Yinshi (楊殷士). This thus brought a popular uproar, and Duan submitted a report accusing Yang Rushi and Qian of being unfair. When Emperor Muzong requested opinions from the imperial scholars, Li Deyu, Yuan, and Li Shen all agreed with Duan's opinion. Emperor Muzong thus ordered Li Zongmin's colleague Wang Qi (王起) to conduct a re-examination, while demoting Qian, Li Zongmin, and Yang Rushi to be prefectural prefects and deposing 10 of the examinees selected by Qian and Yang Rushi. In Li Zongmin's case, he was demoted to be the prefect of Jian Prefecture (劍州, in modern Guangyuan, Sichuan).

However, Li Zongmin would not remain at Jian Prefecture for a long time, as he was recalled in or before 823 to be Zhongshu Sheren again. In winter 823, he was made acting deputy minister of civil service affairs (吏部侍郎, Lìbu Shilang, note different tone than the ministry of rites), and was apparently responsible for the imperial examinations the following year, for following the imperial examinations in 824, he was made acting deputy minister of defense (兵部侍郎, Bingbu Shilang).

== During Emperor Jingzong's reign ==
In 825, by which time Emperor Muzong's son Emperor Jingzong was emperor, Li Zongmin was made full deputy minister of defense. Sometime thereafter, though, his father died, and he left government service to observe a mourning period for his father.

== During Emperor Wenzong's reign ==
In 828, by which time Emperor Jingzong's younger brother Emperor Wenzong was emperor, Li Zongmin was recalled to the imperial government to serve as deputy minister of civil service affairs.

In 829, Pei Du recommended Li Deyu, who was then the military governor of Zhenhai Circuit (鎮海, headquartered in modern Zhenjiang, Jiangsu) as chancellor, and Li Deyu was recalled from Zhenghai. However, it was said that because Li Zongmin was favored by powerful eunuchs, due to his association with Shen Yi, the husband of Emperor Xianzong's daughter Princess Xuancheng, and, through Shen, the female palace scholar Song Ruoxian (宋若憲) and the powerful eunuch Yang Chenghe (楊承和) the director of palace communications, Li Zongmin was made the deputy head of the legislative bureau (中書侍郎, Zhongshu Shilang) and chancellor de facto with the designation Tong Zhongshu Menxia Pingzhangshi (同中書門下平章事). Soon thereafter, Li Zongmin had Li Deyu, whom he viewed as a threat, sent out of the capital Chang'an to serve as the military governor of Yicheng Circuit (義成, headquartered in modern Anyang, Henan). He also recommended Niu Sengru, who was then the military governor of Wuchang Circuit (武昌, headquartered in modern Wuhan, Hubei), and Niu was recalled to Chang'an to also serve as chancellor. It was said that the two of them worked together and began to eject Li Deyu's allies from the imperial government. In particular, because Li Deyu became resentful of Pei for having recommended Li Deyu, in late 830, because Pei had said that he was ill, Li Zongmin used the illness as reason to have Pei sent to Shannan East Circuit (山南東道, headquartered in modern Xiangfan, Hubei to be its military governor.

In 832, Li Deyu, after a well-regarded stint as the military governor of Xichuan Circuit (西川, headquartered in modern Chengdu, Sichuan), was recalled to Chang'an, to serve as the minister of defense, and it was believed that because Emperor Wenzong was impressed by his service at Xichuan, Li Deyu would soon be chancellor. Li Zongmin, without Niu as an ally at Chang'an at this point (as Niu had resigned his chancellorship earlier in the year), was apprehensive of this development, and he consulted his associate, Du Cong the mayor of Jingzhao (京兆, i.e., the Chang'an region) as to what he should do. Du suggested a truce with Li Deyu — pointing out that while Li Deyu, whose career as an official was launched by his status as Li Jifu's son rather than through imperial examinations, was deeply jealous of the officials who had gone through imperial examinations, and that Li Zongmin could effectuate a truce by recommending Li Deyu to be responsible for the imperial examinations. Li Zongmin did not want to do this, however, and under an alternative proposed by Du, offered to recommend Li Deyu as chief imperial censor. Du visited Li Deyu to inform him of this, and Li Deyu was grateful. However, after Li Zongmin consulted another associate, the imperial attendant Yang Yuqing (楊虞卿), Yang opposed this idea, and Li Zongmin did not actually recommend Li Deyu.

In 833, Emperor Wenzong made Li Deyu a chancellor. When Li Deyu met with Emperor Wenzong to thank him, Emperor Wenzong asked him what the most pressing issue at the imperial government that he saw was, and Li Deyu indicated that it was partisanship — knowing that at that time, Emperor Wenzong was already displeased with Yang Yuqing, whom Emperor Wenzong saw as participating in aggressive partisanship with his cousin Yang Rushi (楊汝士) (then a Zhongshu Sheren), brother Yang Hangong (楊漢公) (a supervisory official at the ministry of census (戶部, Hubu), and other associates Zhang Yuanfu (張元夫) (a Zhongshu Sheren) and Xiao Huan (蕭澣) (also an imperial attendant). Li Deyu further used this to accuse others of being associated with Yang Yuqing in order to eject people he disfavored from the imperial government. Later in the year, after Emperor Wenzong, without consulting with Li Zongmin at all, made Zheng Tan the chief imperial censor, Li Zongmin was distressed. Soon thereafter, Li Zongmin was sent out of Chang'an to serve as the military governor of Shannan West Circuit (山南西道, headquartered in modern Hanzhong, Shaanxi) as well as the mayor of its capital Xingyuan Municipality (興元), although he retained the Tong Zhongshu Menxia Pingzhangshi designation as an honorary title.

In 834, as Li Deyu had offended Emperor Wenzong's close associates Li Zhongyan and Zheng Zhu, as well as the powerful eunuch Wang Shoucheng (who had recommended Li Zhongyan and Zheng), Wang, Zheng, and Li Zhongyan wanted to find someone to counter Li Deyu. They knew that Li Deyu and Li Zongmin were political enemies, and so they had Li Zongmin recalled to Chang'an to again serve as Zhongshu Shilang and chancellor. Soon thereafter, Li Deyu was sent out of the capital to serve as the military governor of Shannan West Circuit. Li Deyu subsequently met with Emperor Wenzong and requested that he be allowed to stay at Chang'an, and so Emperor Wenzong initially made him the minister of defense again, but when Li Zongmin objected that Li Deyu should not be allowed to do whatever he wanted, Emperor Wenzong sent Li Deyu back to Zhenhai Circuit to serve as its military governor.

In 835, there was a rumor spread at Chang'an that Zheng was creating immortality pills for Emperor Wenzong and that the pills required infant hearts and livers as ingredients. This caused much panic among the people, and Zheng, who had long despised Yang Yuqing (who was by this point the mayor of Jingzhao), accused Yang's family members of spreading the rumors. Meanwhile, Li Zongmin had also drawn Zheng's ire because he refused Zheng's request to become an official at either the legislative bureau or the examination bureau (門下省, Menxia Sheng). Thereafter, when Yang was arrested and Li Zongmin tried to intervene on his behalf, Emperor Wenzong became so angry that he ordered Li Zongmin to leave his presence. Soon thereafter, Li Zongmin was demoted to be the prefect of Ming Prefecture (明州, in modern Ningbo, Zhejiang). Soon thereafter, Zheng revealed that Li Zongmin had first become chancellor through the intercessions of Shen, Song, and Yang Chenghe, and Li Zongmin was further demoted to be the secretary general of Chu Prefecture (處州, in modern Lishui, Zhejiang), and then the census officer at Chao Prefecture (潮州, in modern Chaozhou, Guangdong). A large number of Li Zongmin's associates were also demoted, and it was said that Li Zhongyan (whose name had been changed to Li Xun by this point) and Zheng, whenever they disliked someone, would accuse that person of being an associate of either Li Zongmin's or Li Deyu's, thus causing massive demotions at the imperial government.

Late in 835, a plot by Emperor Wenzong, Li Xun, and Zheng to slaughter the eunuchs (known as the Ganlu Incident) ended in utter failure, with the eunuchs slaughtering a large number of officials, including Li Xun, Zheng, and Li Xun's fellow chancellors Wang Ya, Jia Su, and Shu Yuanyu. Thereafter, in 836, it was said that those accused of being Li Deyu's and Li Zongmin's associates were beginning to receive reprieves, and Li Zongmin himself was moved closer to Chang'an, to serve as the military advisor to the prefect of Heng Prefecture (modern Hengyang, Hunan).

By 838, Yang Sifu, who was friendly with Li Zongmin, was chancellor, and he wanted to have Li Zongmin recalled. He first consulted with Zheng Tan, who was also chancellor at that time, and Zheng opposed vehemently. Subsequently, Yang, Zheng, and fellow chancellor Chen Yixing (who also opposed any such recall) argued with each other in harsh words before Emperor Wenzong, drawing Emperor Wenzong's displeasure. In the aftermath of the argument, Li Zongmin was moved to be the prefect of Hang Prefecture (杭州, in modern Hangzhou, Zhejiang) but not recalled to the capital. In 839, Li Zongmin was given an honorary title as a staff member of the Crown Prince Li Yong but had his officer in the eastern capital Luoyang. That year, Zheng and Chen were removed from their chancellor positions, and Yang was said to want to again try to have Li Zongmin recalled to serve as chancellor, but before he could do so, Emperor Wenzong died in spring 840.

== During Emperor Wuzong's reign ==
Emperor Wenzong's brother Li Chan the Prince of Ying, with support from the powerful eunuchs Qiu Shiliang and Yu Hongzhi (魚弘志), became emperor (as Emperor Wuzong). As neither Yang Sifu (who was believed to have supported another brother of Emperor Wenzong's, Li Rong the Prince of An) nor Yang's ally Li Jue (who was believed to have supported Emperor Wenzong's nephew and Emperor Jingzong's son Li Chengmei — whom Emperor Wenzong had made crown prince but was bypassed by the eunuchs) had supported Emperor Wuzong, they were soon stripped of their chancellor posts, and Li Deyu was recalled to be chancellor.

Li Deyu soon dominated the court scene. In 843, after Liu Congjian the military governor of Zhaoyi Circuit (昭義, headquartered in modern Changzhi, Shanxi) died, his nephew Liu Zhen tried to take over the circuit without imperial sanction, and Emperor Wuzong ordered a general campaign against Liu Zhen. Li Deyu used this opportunity to accuse Li Zongmin of having associated with Liu Congjian and thus should not be allowed to be at Luoyang, close to Zhaoyi. Li Zongmin was thus demoted to be the prefect of Hu Prefecture (湖州, in modern Huzhou, Zhejiang). After imperial forces defeated Liu Zhen in 844, Li Deyu further accused Li Zongmin and Niu Sengru of having been complicit in Liu Zhen's rebellion — going as far as (after failing to uncover actual evidence of communications between Liu Congjian, Li Zongmin, and Niu) having Liu Zhen's secretary Zheng Qing (鄭慶) state falsely that whenever Liu Congjian received letters from Li Zongmin or Niu, he would burn them after reading them — Emperor Wuzong, in anger, exiled both Niu and Li Zongmin — in Li Zongmin's case, demoted in multiple stages, first to be the prefect of Zhang Prefecture (漳州, in modern Zhangzhou, Fujian), then to be the secretary general of Zhang Prefecture, and then to be an exile without any officers at Feng Prefecture (封州, in modern Zhaoqing, Guangdong).

== During Emperor Xuānzong's reign ==
In 846, Emperor Wuzong died and was succeeded by his uncle Emperor Xuānzong. Emperor Xuānzong had long despised Li Deyu's hold on power, and soon thereafter Li Deyu was stripped of his chancellor position. Further, five chancellors whom Emperor Wuzong had exiled — Li Zongmin, Niu Sengru, Cui Gong, Yang Sifu, and Li Jue — were all soon ordered to be moved closer to the capital, with Li Zongmin ordered moved to Chen Prefecture (郴州, in modern Chenzhou, Hunan) to be the military advisor to its prefect, but it was said that Li Zongmin died before he could be moved.

== Notes and references ==
- Old Book of Tang, vol. 176.
- New Book of Tang, vol. 174.
- Zizhi Tongjian, vols. 237, 241, 244, 245, 246, 247, 248.
