= Emperor Wuzong of Tang =

Emperor of China from 840 to 846

Emperor Wuzong of Tang 唐武宗
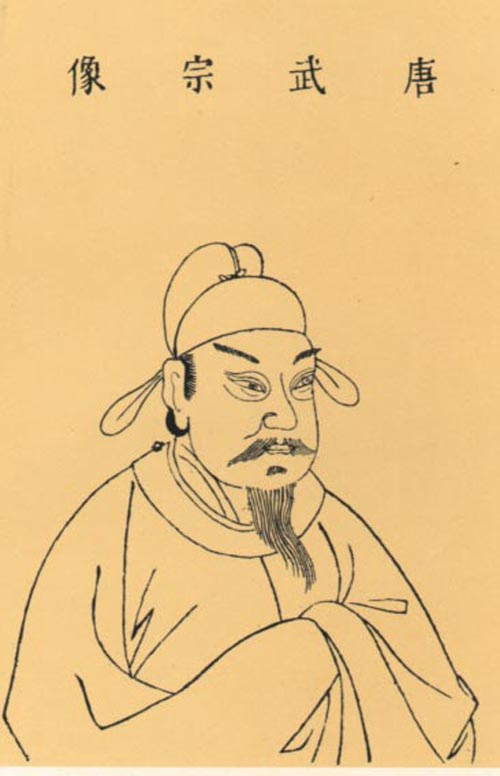
- Portrait of Emperor Wuzong from Sancai Tuhui

Emperor of the Tang dynasty
- Reign: February 20, 840 – April 22, 846
- Predecessor: Emperor Wenzong
- Successor: Emperor Xuanzong
- Born: July 2, 814
- Died: April 22, 846 (aged 31)
- Burial: Duan Mausoleum (端陵)
Era name and dates
- Huìchāng (會昌): January 27, 841 – January 21, 847
Posthumous name
- Emperor Zhidao Zhaosu Xiao 至道昭肅孝皇帝
Temple name
- Wuzong 武宗
- House: Li
- Dynasty: Tang
- Father: Emperor Muzong
- Mother: Empress Xuanyi
- Religion: Taoism

Tang Wuzong
- Chinese: 唐武宗
- Literal meaning: "Martial Ancestor of the Tang"
Transcriptions
Standard Mandarin
- Hanyu Pinyin: Táng Wǔzōng
- Wade–Giles: T'ang Wu-tsung

Li Chan
- Chinese: 李瀍
- Literal meaning: (personal name)
Transcriptions
Standard Mandarin
- Hanyu Pinyin: Lǐ Chán
- Wade–Giles: Li Ch'an

Li Yan
- Chinese: 李炎
- Literal meaning: (personal name)
Transcriptions
Standard Mandarin
- Hanyu Pinyin: Lǐ Yán
- Wade–Giles: Li Yen

Emperor Wuzong of Tang (July 2, 814 – April 22, 846), né Li Chan, later changed to Li Yan just before his death, was the 18th emperor of the Tang dynasty of China, reigning from 840 to 846. Emperor Wuzong is mainly known in modern times for the religious persecution that occurred during his reign. However, he was also known for his successful reactions against incursions by remnants of the Uyghur Khanate and the rebellion by Liu Zhen, as well as his deep trust and support for chancellor Li Deyu.

== Background ==
Li Chan was born in 814, as the ninth son of Li Heng at least, who was then Crown Prince under Li Chan's grandfather Emperor Xianzong. He was born at the Eastern Palace (i.e., the Crown Prince's palace). His mother was Consort Wei, whose rank was lost to history. After Li Heng became Emperor Muzong in 820, he made many of his brothers and sons princes in 821, and Li Chan was made the Prince of Ying. Little is known about Li Chan's activities during the reigns of Emperor Muzong or Li Chan's older brothers Emperor Jingzong (Emperor Muzong's oldest son) and Emperor Wenzong (Emperor Muzong's second son), other than that during the middle of Emperor Wenzong's Kaicheng era (836–840), Emperor Wenzong bestowed the honorary title of Kaifu Yitong Sansi (開府儀同三司) on him, as well as the title of honorary minister of civil service affairs (吏部尚書, Libu Shangshu). It was said that Li Chan was silent, intelligent, and decisive, not showing his emotions easily. It was also said that Emperor Wenzong treated him and another brother, Li Rong the Prince of An, better than other princes.

Emperor Wenzong originally created his son Li Yong crown prince, but after Li Yong died in 838, he was unsure whom to make his successor. Emperor Wenzong's favorite concubine Consort Yang recommended Li Rong, but when Emperor Wenzong consulted the chancellors, Li Jue opposed this proposal. Emperor Wenzong thus, in 839, created Emperor Jingzong's youngest son Li Chengmei the Prince of Chen crown prince. When Emperor Wenzong became seriously ill early in 840, he had his trusted eunuchs Liu Hongyi (劉弘逸) and Xue Jileng (薛季稜) summon the chancellors Yang Sifu and Li Jue to the palace, intending to entrust Li Chengmei to them. However, the powerful eunuchs Qiu Shiliang and Yu Hongzhi (魚弘志), who were not consulted in the decision, opposed Li Chengmei, and despite Li Jue's objection, forged an edict in Emperor Wenzong's name deposing Li Chengmei by claiming that Li Chengmei was too young, and creating Li Chan crown prince instead. Subsequently, Qiu and Yu had soldiers escort Li Chan from his mansion to the palace and, after Emperor Wenzong then died, persuaded Li Chan to order Consort Yang, Li Chengmei, and Li Rong all to commit suicide. After a short mourning period, Li Chan took the throne (as Emperor Wuzong).

== Reign ==
=== Religious persecution ===
Buddhism had flourished into a major religious force in China during the Tang period, and its monasteries enjoyed tax-exempt status. Because they didn't contribute taxes, Emperor Wuzong believed Buddhism to be a drain on the state's economy. Coupled with his devotion to Taoism as well and his deep trust in the Taoist monk Zhao Guizhen (趙歸真), he set out to act against Buddhism, initiating an imperial edict in 842 weeding out sorcerers and convicts from the ranks of the Buddhist monks and nuns, and returning them to lay life. Monks and nuns were to turn their wealth over to the government unless they returned to lay life and paid taxes. During this first phase, Confucian arguments for the reform of Buddhist institutions and the protection of society from Buddhist influence and practices were predominant.

The religious persecution reached its height in the year 845 CE, ultimately confiscating the Buddhist temple properties, destroying 4,600 Buddhist temples and 40,000 shrines, and removing 260,500 monks and nuns from the monasteries. Emperor Wuzong's reasons for doing so were not purely economic. A zealous Taoist, Wuzong considered Buddhism a foreign religion that was harmful to Chinese society. One notable victim of the persecution was the Japanese Tendai monk Ennin.

Among its purposes were to raise war funds and to cleanse China of foreign influences. As such, the persecution was directed not only towards Buddhism but also towards other foreign religions, such as Zoroastrianism, Nestorian Christianity, and Manichaeism. Only the native Chinese ideologies of Confucianism and Taoism survived the upheaval relatively unaffected. He all but destroyed Zoroastrianism and Manichaeism in China, and his persecution of the growing Nestorian Christian churches sent Chinese Christianity into a decline from which it never recovered.

At the same time, Wuzong went far to promote Taoist worship in China through religious regulations and the construction of the Temple for Viewing Immortals in the Imperial court. (Emperor Wuzong was one of the last Tang emperors and ruled China during a long period of decline; despite his reforms, he was unable to revive the empire through his religious persecutions. After his death, with the help of his uncle Emperor Xuānzong, Buddhism was able to recover from the persecution; but Christianity, Manichaeism, and Zoroastrianism never again played as significant a role in Chinese religious life.)

=== Dealing with the Uyghur incursions ===
By the time that Emperor Wuzong took the throne, his mother Consort Wei had already died, and he posthumously honored her as an empress dowager. Also, knowing that Yang Sifu and Li Jue had not supported him as Emperor Wenzong's successor, he had them removed from their offices. He instead installed Li Deyu, former chancellor under Wenzong, as a chancellor and effectively put most of the responsibilities of governance in his hands. (In 841, Emperor Wuzong further ordered Liu Hongyi and Xue Jileng to commit suicide and planned to order Yang and Li Jue to do so as well, but Yang and Li Jue were spared (and only demoted) after the intercession by Li Deyu and the other chancellors, Cui Gong, Cui Dan, and Chen Yixing.)

One of the first things that Emperor Wuzong had to deal with was the collapse of the Uyghur Khanate, which had served as Tang's vassal and ally in various campaigns through the decades. In 840, due to internal power struggles, the khaganate was weakened, such that when the Xiajiasi (Kirghiz) khan Are (阿熱) attacked, the Uyghur khan Yaoluoge Hesa (藥羅葛闔馺) was killed. The khaganate's Nine Clans scattered, fleeing in various directions. One major group, under the leadership of the prince Wamosi and the nobles Chixin (赤心), Pugu (僕固), and Najiachuo (那頡啜), headed for the Tang border city of Tiande (天德, in modern Hohhot, Inner Mongolia) and sought to submit to Tang. The leader of another major group, the noble Yaoluoge Wuxi, claimed the khan title for himself (as Wujie Khan). Wujie Khan subsequently seized Emperor Wuzong's aunt Princess Taihe, who had married a previous khan (Chongde Khan), and held her hostage. Other Uyghur remnants pillaged along the Tang border, causing great disruption in the area. At Li Deyu's suggestion, Emperor Wuzong supplied food to the displaced Uyghurs to try to calm them, while accepting Wamosi's submission. When Wujie Khan subsequently demanded that Tang turn Wamosi over to him as a traitor, Emperor Wuzong refused.

Subsequently, Wujie Khan's forces and Tang's border defense forces came into open conflict, even though both sides continued negotiations. In 843, the Tang general Liu Mian (劉沔) launched a surprise attack against Wujie Khan, led by his officer Shi Xiong. Shi crushed Wujie Khan's forces and rescued Princess Taihe. Wujie Khan fled, and subsequently, the Uyghur tribes created only minor nuisances for Tang and no longer posed a major threat.

=== The Zhaoyi campaign ===
Immediately after the dissipation of the Uyghur threat, however, Emperor Wuzong faced a crisis of a different kind. In 843, Liu Congjian the military governor (Jiedushi) of Zhaoyi Circuit (昭義, headquartered in modern Changzhi, Shanxi), who had governed Zhaoyi in de facto independence from the imperial government and who had a strident rivalry with Qiu Shiliang, was seriously ill, and Liu wanted his adoptive son (and biological nephew) Liu Zhen to succeed him, and set up the power structure at the circuit to facilitate the transition. He submitted petitions requesting that Liu Zhen be allowed to take over the circuit. When Liu Congjian thereafter died, Liu Zhen sought to inherit the circuit. Li Deyu, believing that this would be a prime opportunity for the imperial government to seize control of Zhaoyi Circuit, advocated a campaign against Liu Zhen, and Emperor Wuzong agreed.

Initially, the imperial government was concerned that three other de facto independent circuits north of the Yellow River (Weibo (魏博, headquartered in modern Handan, Hebei), then governed by He Hongjing; Chengde (成德, headquartered in modern Shijiazhuang, Hebei), then governed by Wang Yuankui; and Lulong (盧龍, headquartered in modern Beijing, then governed by Zhang Zhongwu) would side with Zhaoyi. Emperor Wuzong secured their cooperation by effectively promising the three circuits that he would not interfere with their independence, and in fact secured the military cooperation of both Weibo and Chengde in the campaign against Zhaoyi by leaving the task of capturing Zhaoyi's three eastern prefectures, east of the Taihang Mountains, to Wang and He Hongjing. The other imperial generals, including Wang Zai, Shi Xiong, and Liu Mian, concentrated on Zhaoyi's two western prefectures, including its capital Lu Prefecture (潞州). Initially, the imperial forces could not advance well against Zhaoyi forces, and the campaign was complicated by a mutiny by the officer Yang Bian (楊弁) at Hedong Circuit (河東, headquartered in modern Taiyuan, Shanxi) early in 844. Yang's mutiny was quickly put down, however, and the imperial forces continued their assault on Zhaoyi. In fall 844, the three eastern prefectures surrendered to He Hongjing and Wang Yuankui, and soon thereafter, Liu Zhen was killed by his own officer Guo Yi (郭誼), who then surrendered.

=== After the Zhaoyi campaign ===
After the Zhaoyi campaign, Li Deyu used the opportunity to carry reprisals against his political enemies in the Niu-Li Factional Struggles—those who were members of what would later be referred to as the Niu Faction (named after Niu Sengru) against Li Deyu's Li Faction—including the former chancellors Niu Sengru and Li Zongmin—by accusing them of complicity in Liu Zhen's rebellion. As a result, Niu and Li Zongmin were exiled to remote regions.

In 845, Emperor Wuzong wanted to create his favorite concubine, Consort Wang, empress. Li Deyu, pointing out that Consort Wang was of low birth and that she was sonless, opposed. Emperor Wuzong therefore did not do so. (Emperor Wuzong had five known sons, but very little is known about them other than their names and their princely titles.)

Late in Emperor Wuzong's life, he began taking pills made by Taoist alchemists, which were intended to lead to immortality, and it was said that his mood became harsh and unpredictable as a side effect. By late 845, he was seriously ill. In early 846, in an attempt to ward off the illness, he changed his name to Li Yan—under the theory that under the Wu Xing cosmology, his original name of Chan (瀍) contained two instances of earth (土) while only containing one instance of water (水), which meant that he was getting suppressed by the dynasty's own spirits (as Tang beliefs included that the dynasty was protected by earth), while Yan (炎) contained two instances of fire (火), which was more harmonious with earth. Despite this change, his conditions did not get better. The eunuchs, believing that Emperor Wuzong's uncle Li Yi the Prince of Guang to be simple-minded, decided to make him Emperor Wuzong's successor; they therefore had an edict issued in Emperor Wuzong's name creating Li Yi crown prince (and changing Li Yi's name to Li Chen). Soon thereafter, Emperor Wuzong died after drinking an elixir of immortality, and Li Chen took the throne as Emperor Xuānzong.

== Chancellors during reign ==
- Yang Sifu (840)
- Li Jue (840)
- Cui Dan (840–841)
- Cui Gong (840–843)
- Li Deyu (840–846)
- Chen Yixing (841–842)
- Li Shen (842–844)
- Li Rangyi (842–846)
- Cui Xuan (843–845)
- Du Cong (844–845)
- Li Hui (845–846)
- Zheng Su (845–846)

== Family ==
- Empress, of the Zheng clan (皇后 郑氏/鄭氏), not recorded in "Old Books of Tang"
- Worthy Consort of the Wang clan (賢妃 王氏/贤妃王氏; d. 846)
- Virtuous Consort, of the Liu clan (德妃 刘氏/劉氏)
- Pure Consort, of the Wang clan (淑妃 王氏)
- Worthy Consort, of the Liu clan (贤妃 刘氏/賢妃 )
- Consort, of the Yang clan (妃 杨氏/楊氏)
- Zhaoyi, of the Wu clan (昭儀 吴氏/昭仪 )
- Zhaoyi, of the Shen clan (昭儀 沈氏/昭仪)
- Zhaoyi, of the Zhang clan (昭儀 張氏/昭仪 张氏)
- Zhaoyi, of the Zhao clan (昭儀 赵氏/昭仪 趙氏)
- Zhaoyi, of the Dong clan (昭仪 董氏/昭儀)
- Cairen, of the Meng clan (才人孟氏)
- Unknown
  - Li Jun, Prince Qi (杞王 李峻), first son
  - Li Xian, Prince Yi (益王 李峴/李岘), second son
  - Li Qi, Prince Yan (兗王 李岐), third son
  - Li Yi, Prince De (德王 李嶧/李峄), fourth son
  - Li Cuo, Prince Chang (昌王 李嵯), fifth son
  - Princess Changle (昌樂公主/昌乐公主), first daughter
  - Princess Shouchun (壽春公主/寿春公主), second daughter
  - Princess Yongning (永寧公主/永宁公主), third daughter
  - Princess Yanqing (延慶公主/延庆公主), fourth daughter
  - Princess Jingle (靖樂公主/靖乐), fifth daughter
  - Princess Lewen (樂溫公主/乐温公主), sixth daughter
  - Princess Changning (長寧公主/长宁公主), seventh daughter

== See also ==
- Buddhism in China
- Christianity in China
- Islam in China
- Persecution of Buddhists
- Persecution of Christians
- Persecution of Muslims

Emperor Wuzong of Tang House of Li Born: 2 July 814 Died: 22 April 846
Regnal titles
Preceded by Emperor Wenzong of Tang	Emperor of the Tang dynasty 840–846	Succeeded by Emperor Xuanzong of Tang
