= Niu Sengru =

Tang Dynasty chancellor (780–849)

Niu Sengru (Chinese: 牛僧孺; 780 – January 27, 849), courtesy name Si'an (思黯), posthumous name Duke Wenzhen of Qizhang (奇章文貞公), was a prominent statesman, scholar, chuanqi writer, and poet of China's Tang dynasty. Niu served multiple terms as a chancellor under Emperor Muzong and the latter's sons Emperor Jingzong and Emperor Wenzong. Alternately in and out of imperial favor and high office amid turbulence in the imperial court, Niu also served as the minister of war and a provincial military governor. Traditional historians often considered him a leader of the eponymous "Niu faction" in the Niu-Li factional struggles of the eighth-century Tang court, though contemporary scholars have questioned the degree to which Niu actively engaged in factional politics. Niu was regarded by contemporaries, including his political adversary Li Deyu, as an official of high integrity, and he was posthumously awarded prestigious honors after his death in the reign of Emperor Xuanzong.

Niu's literary output spanned multiple genres, including poetry and chuanqi, a form of fantastical short story popular in the later Tang. Niu's chuanqi anthology Accounts of Mysteries and Monsters (玄怪錄) is considered a step in the evolution of Tang fiction. While prior chuanqi writers had presented their writings as reflections of actual events, Niu clearly portrayed his subject matter as fictional and included detailed characterization in his work.

== Background ==
Assuming that Niu Sengru died in the Wuchen year of the Dazhong era (847-859) of Emperor Xuānzong as asserted in the commemorative text written by Li Jue, Niu was born in Lingtai County, Pingliang in 780, during the reign of Emperor Dezong. He was a descendant of the prominent Sui dynasty official Niu Hong (牛弘). His grandfather Niu Shao (牛紹) served as a consultant at the ministry of worship, while his father Niu Youwen (牛幼聞) served as a county magistrate. His father died when he was young, and he tended a farm at Xiadu (下杜, near the capital Chang'an) that his family had previously been bestowed to make a living. He was capable in writing, and eventually passed the imperial examinations in 805, in the same year as eventual colleague and ally Li Zongmin.

== During Emperor Xianzong's reign ==
Niu Sengru eventually did serve as the magistrate of Yijue County (伊闕, in modern Luoyang, Henan). In 808, when Emperor Dezong's grandson Emperor Xianzong held a special imperial examination for the examinees to give honest criticism of government, the officials in charge of the examination, Wei Guanzhi and Yang Yuling (楊於陵), selected three examinees who gave blunt criticism — Niu, Huangfu Shi (皇甫湜), and Li Zongmin — for top marks. However, the chancellor Li Jifu were stung by the criticism that they gave and viewed these as personal attacks against him. Li Jifu tearfully complained to Emperor Xianzong that the reviewers of the scores that Wei and Yang gave — the imperial scholars Pei Ji and Wang Ya — had conflicts of interest, as Huangfu was Wang's nephew. As a result of Li Jifu's accusations, Pei, Wang, Yang, and Wei were all demoted, with Wei initially demoted to be the prefect of Guo Prefecture (果州, in modern Nanchong, Sichuan), and then further moved to be the prefect of Ba Prefecture (巴州, in modern Bazhong, Sichuan). Niu, Huangfu, and Li Zongmin were not exiled, but they were said in the Zizhi Tongjian to be effectively stalled in their careers, forcing them to find governmental positions themselves under regional governors. However, the other traditional accounts of Niu's own career did not indicate that he served under a regional governor at all; rather, he continued to serve as the magistrate of Yijue, and then the magistrate of Henan County (河南, one of the two counties making up the eastern capital Luoyang). He later served as an imperial censor with the title Jiancha Yushi (監察御史), then Kaogong Yuanwailang (考功員外郎), a low-level official at the ministry of civil service affairs (吏部, Libu), as well as an imperial scholar at Jixian Hall (集賢殿).

== During Emperor Muzong's reign ==
After Emperor Xianzong died in 820 and was succeeded by his son Emperor Muzong, Niu Sengru was promoted to Kubu Langzhong (庫部郎中), a supervisorial official at the ministry of defense (戶部, Bingbu), and was put in charge of drafting imperial edicts. Later that year, he was made deputy chief imperial censor (御史中丞, Yushi Zhongcheng). At that time, there was a backlog of criminal cases in the prefectures, causing many people to be unduly detained while waiting adjudication. Niu worked to unclog the backlog, and indicted many responsible officials, causing the popular sentiment to respect him. In 821, when Li Zhichen (李直臣) the prefect of Su Prefecture (宿州, in modern Suzhou, Anhui) was accused of corruption and sentenced to death, powerful eunuchs received Li Zhichen's bribes and spoke on his behalf. Emperor Muzong thus commented to Niu, "Li Zhichen is talented, and should be pitied." Niu responded, in advocating for Li Zhichen's death:

Those without talents would only worry about feeding and clothing themselves and their wives and children, and there needs not to be any worries about them. The law exists to stop those with talents. An Lushan and Zhu Ci [(two generals who had in previously decades rebelled against Tang rule)] were both highly talented people that the law did not stop.

Emperor Muzong agreed with Niu and accepted his suggestion. Emperor Muzong thereafter greatly respected Niu. Meanwhile, in 823, the former chancellor and major general Han Hong died, shortly after Han Hong's son Han Gongwu (韓公武) had died. Han Hong had served as the military governor of Xuanwu Circuit (宣武, headquartered in modern Kaifeng, Henan) for a long time and amassed great wealth. After Han Hong had offered to stay at the capital Chang'an in 819, he, at Han Gongwu's suggestion, offered many bribes to other officials in Chang'an such that his deeds at Xuanwu would not be further looked into. After both Han Hong and Han Gongwu died, there was a dispute involving the property that Han Hong left his young grandson Han Shaozong (韓紹宗). Emperor Muzong, pitying Han Shaozong's situation, ordered that Han Hong's property registries be given to the emperor personally for him to review. While Emperor Muzong was reviewing Han Hong's records, he discovered the bribes that Han Hong had been giving other officials, and he reached an entry indicating that a bribe had been offered to Niu but Niu rejected it. Emperor Muzong was very pleased and showed the entry to his attendants, stating, "I did not make a mistake judging him." He therefore made Niu Zhongshu Shilang (中書侍郎), the deputy head of the legislative bureau of government (中書省, Zhongshu Sheng), and chancellor de facto with the title Tong Zhongshu Menxia Pingzhangshi (同中書門下平章事). At that time, both Niu and Li Jifu's son Li Deyu were considered serious candidates for chancellorship, but while Niu was indeed made chancellor, Li Deyu was made the governor of Zhexi Circuit (浙西, headquartered in modern Zhenjiang, Jiangsu) and stuck there for eight years without movement. Li Deyu therefore came to believe that the chancellor Li Fengji had endorsed Niu and squeezed him out of the picture. The rivalry between Niu and Li Deyu, already precipitated by Li Jifu's earlier taking offense at Niu's examination answers, therefore grew more bitter.

== During Emperor Jingzong's reign ==
Emperor Muzong died in 824 and was succeeded by his son Emperor Jingzong. Upon enthronement, Emperor Jingzong conferred the honorary title of Yinqing Guanglu Daifu (銀青光祿大夫) on Niu Sengru, and also created him the Viscount of Qizhang. Late in the year, Emperor Jingzong upgraded his honorary title to Jinzi Guanglu Daifu and created him the Duke of Qizhang — a title that his ancestor Niu Hong had carried. Emperor Jingzong also put him in charge of editing the imperial history.

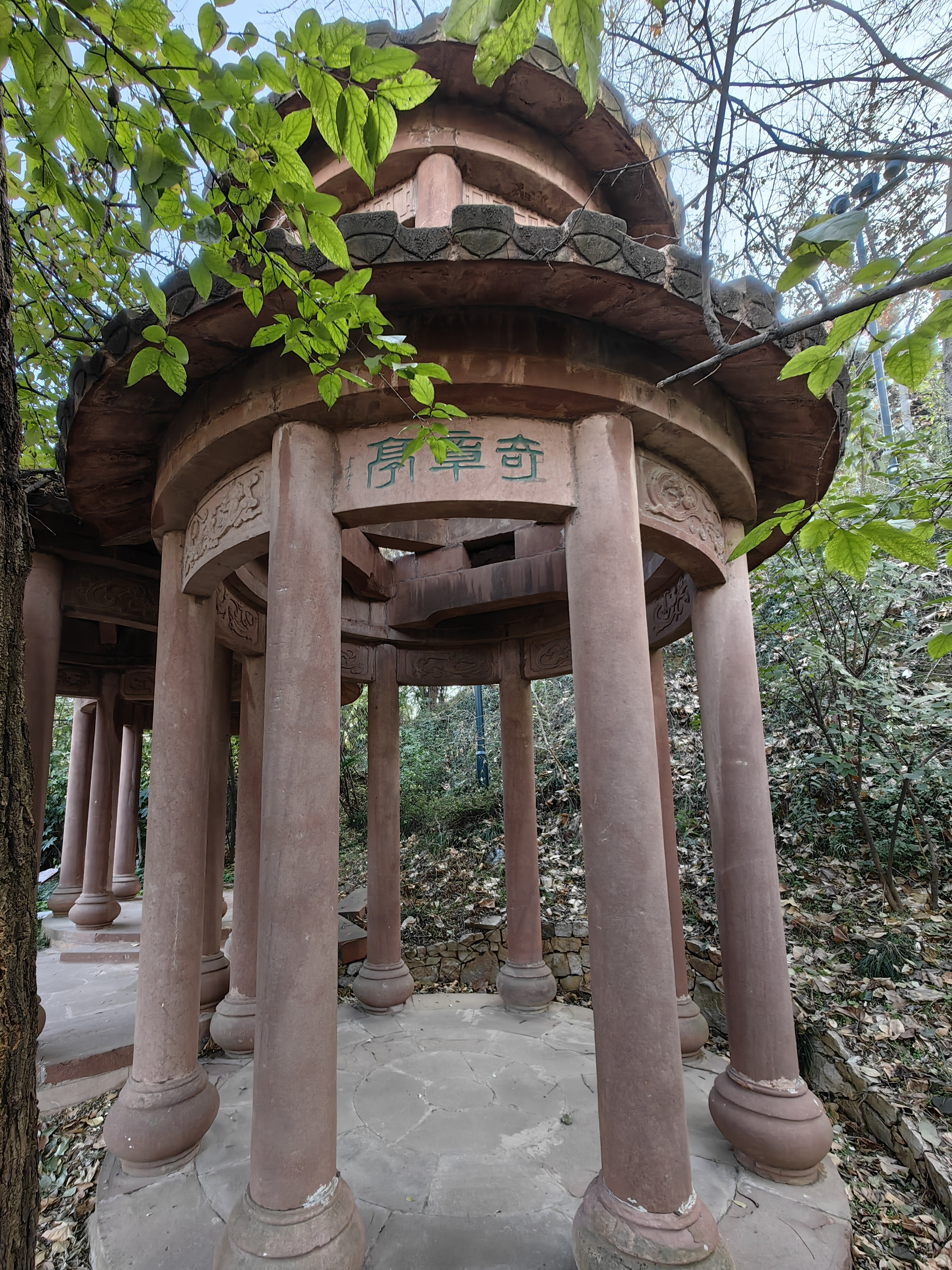
The Qizhang Pavilion in Yellow Crane Tower Park, was built in memory of Niu Sengru

By 825, Niu had come to the conclusion that Emperor Jingzong was frivolous and not diligent, and that wicked people around Emperor Jingzong wielded actual power. He did not dare to speak on the issue in fear of bringing disaster on himself, so he repeatedly offered to resign and take a regional governor post. In spring 825, Emperor Jingzong converted Eyue Circuit (鄂岳, headquartered in modern Wuhan, Hubei) to Wuchang Circuit and made Niu the military governor (Jiedushi) of Wuchang, continuing to carry the Tong Zhongshu Menxia Pingzhangshi title as an honorary title. (When he went through Xiangyang, the military governor of Shannan East Circuit (山南東道, headquartered at Xiangyang), Liu Gongchuo (柳公綽), in order to show respect to the central government, as Niu was recently chancellor, paid respect to Niu, over his staff's objection, even though they had the same rank as military governor and Shannan East was considered a circuit with higher precedence than Wuchang.)

Due to the humidity at Wuchang's capital city Jiangxia (江夏), the city walls were often crumbling, and each year required repair with green soil. The labor levies of each year were heavy, and the bureaucrats took the opportunity to be corrupt as well. Once Niu arrived at Wuchang, he began a project to repair the walls with bricks instead, and it was said that after completion of the project, the Jiangxia walls no longer suffered from damage due to humidity. Because one of the prefectures of Wuchang, Mian Prefecture (沔州, in modern Xiantao, Hubei), was just across the Yangtze River from Wuchang's capital prefecture E Prefecture (鄂州), Niu requested that Mian Prefecture be merged into E Prefecture, to reduce administrative burdens on the people.

== During Emperor Wenzong's reign ==
In 830, by which time Emperor Jingzong's younger brother Emperor Wenzong was emperor, Li Zongmin was a chancellor. When, in spring 830, Niu Sengru went to Chang'an to pay homage to Emperor Wenzong, Li Zongmin argued to Emperor Wenzong that Niu was capable and should be kept at the central government. Emperor Wenzong thus again made Niu a chancellor with the title of Tong Zhongshu Menxia Pingzhangshi, as well as the minister of defense (兵部尚書, Bingbu Shangshu). It was said that, with Niu and Li Zongmin in power, they spent much effort in expelling Li Deyu's partisans out of the central government.

In 831, Li Zaiyi the military governor of Lulong Circuit (盧龍, headquartered in modern Beijing) — who had ruled Lulong largely independently from the imperial government but which had been respectful to the imperial government and following many of its orders, including in a recent campaign against the warlord Li Tongjie — was overthrown and expelled from Lulong by his officer Yang Zhicheng. When Emperor Wenzong contemplated how to react to the situation, Niu pointed out that Lulong had not actually belonged to the imperial government for decades and that a campaign against Yang would be futile. Under his suggestion, Yang was allowed to keep the command of Lulong, while Emperor Wenzong, due to Li Zaiyi's previous accomplishments, made him the military governor of Shannan West Circuit (山南西道, headquartered in modern Hanzhong, Shaanxi). (Niu's advocacy for taking no actions against Yang drew a sharply-worded criticism from the Song dynasty historian Sima Guang in his Zizhi Tongjian.)

Also in 831, Niu's chancellor colleague Song Shenxi was accused of plotting to overthrow Emperor Wenzong and to replace him with his brother Li Cou the Prince of Zhang. (The accusations against Song had come about because Emperor Wenzong and Song were planning to massacre the powerful eunuchs, and the eunuchs reacted by manufacturing evidence of Song's alleged treason.) Emperor Wenzong initially believed the accusations and was set to execute Song, but Niu, along with a large number of other officials, spoke on the implausibility that Song, already a chancellor, would plot treason. Instead, Li Cou was demoted in his rank, and Song was exiled, but both were spared.

Late in 831, Li Deyu, then the military governor of Xichuan Circuit (西川, headquartered in modern Chengdu, Sichuan), reported that Xidamou (悉怛謀), the Tufan officer in charge of Wei Prefecture (維州, in modern Ngawa Tibetan and Qiang Autonomous Prefecture, Sichuan), surrendered Wei Prefecture, which Tufan had captured from Tang decades earlier, to him. Li Deyu advocated accepting the surrender and using Wei Prefecture as a launch pad for a major campaign against Tufan. Niu opposed, arguing that this was a violation of the peace treaty between Tang and Tufan and that, should a war start, Tufan forces could reach Chang'an easily. Emperor Wenzong accepted his argument and ordered that Li Deyu return Wei Prefecture, as well as Xidamou and his soldiers, to Tufan. Tufan had Xidamou and his soldiers massacred. The massacre brought much popular sentiment against Niu, and was commonly viewed at the time to be the result of the conflict between Niu/Li Zongmin and Li Deyu. With Emperor Wenzong regretting the decision, Niu repeatedly offered to resign — particularly given that Emperor Wenzong was repeatedly inquisitive of the chancellors as to when true peace would come to the realm, and Niu seeing true peace as impossible to achieve within a short time and viewing Emperor Wenzong as overly eager. Around the new year 833, Emperor Wenzong made Niu the military governor of Huainan Circuit (淮南, headquartered in modern Yangzhou, Jiangsu), having him keep the Tong Zhongshu Menxia Pingzhangshi title as an honorary title.

In 837, Niu was given the honorary acting Sikong (司空, one of the Three Excellencies) title and made the defender of Luoyang as well as the head of the Luoyang branch office of the executive bureau (尚書省, Shangshu Sheng). It was said that Niu did not care about the relative lack of power he had, and spent his days entertaining guests and collecting rare woods and rocks. In 838, Emperor Wenzong summoned him back to Chang'an to serve as Zuo Pushe (左僕射), one of the heads of the executive bureau. At that time, Emperor Wenzong's son and crown prince Li Yong had recently died after having been severely rebuked by Emperor Wenzong (and the suspicions were that Li Yong was actually killed either on Emperor Wenzong's own orders or with his acquiescence) and, when Niu met Emperor Wenzong, he spoke about the proper ways of father-son relationships, causing Emperor Wenzong to weep. Subsequently, Niu claimed a foot illness and did not meet Emperor Wenzong at the palace again, and Emperor Wenzong excused Niu from his presence. In 839, Emperor Wenzong made Niu the military governor of Shannan East Circuit and the prefect of its capital prefecture Xiang Prefecture (襄州), and having him keep the Tong Zhongshu Menxia Pingzhangshi and Sikong titles as honorary titles. He also awarded Niu many rare ancient vessels and informed Niu that he did not need to rush to report to Shannan East Circuit. Niu, pointing out that Shannan East had just suffered major natural disasters and needed to be tended to immediately, left for Shannan East immediately despite Emperor Wenzong's words.

== During Emperor Wuzong's reign ==
In 840, Emperor Wenzong died and was succeeded by his younger brother Emperor Wuzong. Emperor Wuzong conferred the honorary title of acting Situ (司徒, also one of the Three Excellencies) on Niu Sengru. However, soon after Emperor Wuzong's enthronement, Li Deyu became chancellor and the leading figure in the imperial government. In 841, when a major flood on the Han River destroyed the civilians' houses at Xiang Prefecture, Li Deyu blamed Niu, removed him from his command, and had him made senior advisor to the Crown Prince. In 842, Niu was again made the defender of Luoyang.

In 843, Li Deyu had the matter of Xidamou's surrender reexamined and submitted an accusation against Niu and Li Zongmin. Emperor Wuzong posthumously honored Xidamou, but did not take further actions against Niu or Li Zongmin at that time. (This was commonly viewed as part of a plan for Li Deyu to take vengeance against Niu and Li Zongmin, abandoned only after Li Deyu found a more powerful way to attack them directly).

Later in 843, Liu Congjian the military governor of Zhaoyi Circuit (昭義, headquartered in modern Changzhi, Shanxi). Emperor Wuzong, under Li Deyu's advice, refused to allow Liu Congjian's designated heir, Liu Congjian's nephew Liu Zhen (whom Liu Congjian had adopted as a son), to inherit the circuit and further ordered a general campaign against Liu Zhen. After the imperial forces destroyed Liu Zhen in 844, Li Deyu accused Niu and Li Zongmin, then the prefect of Hu Prefecture (湖州, in modern Huzhou, Zhejiang), of having been complicit in Liu Congjian's ruling Zhaoyi effectively independently while they served as chancellors. He also had Liu Zhen's mansion thoroughly searched for any evidence of communications that Niu and Li Zongmin had with Liu Congjian or Liu Zhen, and, after finding none, induced Liu Congjian's secretary Zheng Qing (鄭慶) to report that Liu Congjian had received many letters from Niu and Li Zongmin but had burned them all. The imperial censors Li Hui (李回) and Zheng Ya (鄭亞) concurred in the report. Further, Lü Shu (呂述) the deputy mayor of Henan Municipality (河南, i.e., the Luoyang region), submitted a report that stated that Niu sighed when the news of Liu Zhen's defeat arrived. Emperor Wuzong, in anger, immediately stripped Niu of his responsibility as defender of Luoyang and demoted him to be an advisor of the Crown Prince and moved Li Zongmin farther from Chang'an, to Zhang Prefecture (漳州, in modern Zhangzhou, Fujian). Soon thereafter, Emperor Wuzong further demoted Niu to be the prefect of Ting Prefecture (汀州, in modern Longyan, Fujian) and Li Zongmin to be the secretary general of Zhang Prefecture. Shortly thereafter, Niu was further demoted to be the secretary general of Xun Prefecture (循州, in modern Huizhou, Guangdong), and Li Zongmin was stripped of all titles and exiled to Feng Prefecture (封州, in modern Zhaoqing, Guangdong).

== During Emperor Xuānzong's reign ==
In 846, Emperor Wuzong died and was succeeded by his uncle Emperor Xuānzong. Emperor Xuāanzong, who had disliked Li Deyu's hold on power, deposed Li Deyu from his post as chancellor, and shortly after began moving the five former chancellors that Emperor Wuzong had exiled — Niu Sengru, Li Zongmin, Cui Gong, Yang Sifu, and Li Jue — closer to the capital, and Niu was moved to be the military advisor to the prefect of Heng Prefecture (Hengyang, Hunan). He was later moved to Ru Prefecture (汝州, in modern Pingdingshan, Henan), before being recalled to Chang'an to again be advisor to the Crown Prince. He died in 849 and was given posthumous honors.

== Notes and references ==
- Old Book of Tang, vol. 172.
- New Book of Tang, vol. 174.
- Zizhi Tongjian, vols. 237, 242, 243, 244, 246, 248.
