= Li Jue (Tang dynasty) =

Li Jue (李珏 or 李玨) (c. 784?–852?), courtesy name Daijia (待價), formally Duke Zhenmu of Zanhuang (贊皇貞穆公), was a Chinese military general and politician during the Tang dynasty, serving as a chancellor during the reigns of Emperor Wenzong and (briefly) Emperor Wenzong's brother Emperor Wuzong. He was considered one of the leaders of the Niu Faction in the Niu-Li Factional Struggles.

== Background and early career ==
Li Jue was born in 784, or possibly 785, during the reign of Emperor Dezong. He claimed ancestry from the eastern branch of the prominent Li clan of Zhao Commandery (趙郡, in modern Shijiazhuang, Hebei), which claimed ancestry from the Warring States period state Zhao's prominent general Li Mu. However, Li Jue's ancestry was not conclusively traceable past his fifth-generation ancestor Li E (李諤), who held a ducal title during Tang dynasty's predecessor dynasty Sui dynasty. His grandfather Li Guangchao (李光朝) served as a military advisor to a prefectural prefect, while his father Li Zhongshu (李仲塾) served as an assistant to the director of the iron and salt monopolies.

In his youth, Li Jue's family lived in Huaiyin (淮陰, in modern Huai'an, Jiangsu). He lost his father early, and he was said to have served his mother with well-known filial piety. After attaining adulthood, he passed the imperial examinations, in the Mingjing class, which was not considered as prestigious as the Jinshi class. When the former chancellor Li Jiang, who was then the prefect of Hua Prefecture (華州, in modern Weinan, Shaanxi), saw Li Jue, he stated to Li Jue that it was inappropriate for someone as talented as he to have only passed the Mingjing class, so he recommended Li Jue to enter the Jinshi examinations, and Li Jue passed with high scores. The military governor (Jiedushi) of Heyang Circuit (河陽, headquartered in modern Jiaozuo, Henan), Wu Chongyin, subsequently invited Li Jue to serve on his staff. After Li Jue later passed a special examination for those making good rulings, he was made the sheriff of Weinan County (渭南, in modern Weinan). He was eventually made You Shiyi (右拾遺), a low-level advisory official at the legislative bureau of government (中書省, Zhongshu Sheng).

== During Emperor Muzong's and Emperor Jingzong's reigns ==
In 820, Emperor Dezong's great-grandson Emperor Muzong became emperor after the death of his father Emperor Xianzong. That year, shortly after Emperor Muzong ended his mourning period for his father, he wanted to hold a grand feast in honor of the great generals Li Guangyan and Li Su. Li Jue, believing this to be inappropriate so soon after Emperor Xianzong's death, submitted a petition jointly with his colleagues Yuwen Ding (宇文鼎), Wen Yu (溫畬), Wei Guan (韋瓘), and Feng Yao (馮藥), urging against it. It was said that while Emperor Muzong did not accept their advice, he treated them with kindness.

In 821, the director of salt and iron monopolies, Wang Bo, increased the tea tax by 50%. Li Jue submitted a petition, arguing that the tax rate was too high, but his argument was not accepted, as Wang Bo had increased the tax in order to pay for Emperor Muzong's palace construction projects. As Li Jue's repeated advice was not accepted, he left the capital Chang'an to serve as the magistrate of Xiagui County (下邽, in modern Weinan). Later, during the reign of Emperor Muzong's son Emperor Jingzong of Tang, when the former chancellor Niu Sengru served as the military governor of Wuchang Circuit (武昌, headquartered in modern Wuhan, Hubei), he invited Li Jue to serve as his secretary.

== During Emperor Wenzong's reign ==
=== Before chancellorship ===
At some point, probably early during the reign of Emperor Jingzong's younger brother Emperor Wenzong, Li Jue was recalled to Chang'an to serve as a low-level imperial censor with the title of Dianzhong Shiyushi (殿中侍御史). The chancellor Wei Chuhou, impressed with him, stated, "He is someone who is capable of cleaning up the government halls. Why have him just serve as someone who attacks?" Li Jue was subsequently made Libu Yuanwailang (禮部員外郎), a low-level official at the ministry of rites (禮部, Libu). In 831, by which time Niu Sengru and Niu's ally Li Zongmin were chancellors, Li Jue was promoted to be Duzhi Langzhong (度支郎中), a supervisory official at the ministry of census (戶部, Hubu) and was put in charge of drafting edicts; he was thereafter also made an imperial scholar (翰林學士, Hanlin Xueshi). In 833, he was made Zhongshu Sheren (中書舍人), a mid-level official at the legislative bureau. In summer 835, he was made the deputy minister of census (戶部侍郎, Hubu Shilang). In fall 835, after Li Zongmin offended Emperor Wenzong and was removed from his post, and Li Jue also offended Emperor Wenzong and Emperor Wenzong's close associate Zheng Zhu by refusing to meet with Zheng, he was sent out of the capital to serve as the prefect of Jiang Prefecture (江州, in modern Jiujiang, Jiangxi).

In 836 — after Zheng and another close associate of Emperor Wenzong's, Li Xun, had been killed after failing in a plot that they hatched with Emperor Wenzong to slaughter the powerful eunuchs — Li Jue was made an advisor to Emperor Wenzong's son and crown prince Li Yong, but ordered to have his office at the eastern capital Luoyang. He was subsequently made the mayor of Henan Municipality (河南, i.e., the Luoyang region). In 837, by which time Li Guyan was chancellor, Li Guyan, who was friendly with him, had him recalled to Chang'an to again serve as the deputy minister of census. In 838, apparently at Li Guyan's recommendation, Li Jue and Yang Sifu were made chancellors with the designation Tong Zhongshu Menxia Pingzhangshi (同中書門下平章事), and Li Jue also continued to serve as deputy minister of census.

=== Chancellorship ===
Immediately, Li Jue's chancellor colleague Chen Yixing was said to despise Yang Sifu and offered to resign, but Chen's request to resign was not accepted by Emperor Wenzong. Further, as Yang advocated for Li Zongmin, who had been exiled, to be moved closer to the capital, and Chen and another chancellor, Zheng Tan, both opposed. It was said that from this point, Yang and Li Jue were often in a factional struggle against Chen and Zheng, causing Emperor Wenzong to be unable to rule on their proposals easily. Meanwhile, as Emperor Wenzong had a love of poetry, he considered establishing imperial scholar positions dedicated to the study of poetry, but Li Jue opposed, pointing out that the popular poetry at the time were stylistically elegant but devoid of content. Emperor Wenzong thus did not carry out his original idea.

In 839, there was a major argument that led to the removals of Chen and Zheng. Emperor Wenzong had praised the talents of the acting director of finances, Du Cong. Yang and Li Jue thereafter recommended Du to be the ministry of census. Chen responded, "Such orders should come from the Emperor. In the past, those who lost stately sovereignty did so by losing their authorities to their subjects." Li Jue responded, "Your Imperial Majesty had told me previously that an Emperor should select chancellors, not suspect them." In a subsequent discussion, Chen again emphasized that the Emperor should not yield authority to his subjects. Li Jue, offended, responded, "Chen Yixing is obviously suspecting that there are chancellors who are stealing power from Your Imperial Majesty. I have often requested retirement, and I would be fortunate to be given a post as an imperial prince's teacher." Zheng then stated, "Your Imperial Majesty ruled well in the first and second years of the Kaicheng era [(i.e., 836 and 837)], while less so in the third and fourth years of Kaicheng [(i.e., 838 and 839)]." Yang responded, "In the first and second years, Zheng Tan and Chen Yixing were in power. In the third and fourth years, your subject and Li Jue joined them. Of course, the crime is mine." He then stated, "I do not dare to again enter the Office of the Chancellors!" He withdrew from Emperor Wenzong's presence. Emperor Wenzong subsequently sent a eunuch to comfort him, and Zheng partially apologized, stating, "Your subject is foolish. I did not intend to point at Yang Sifu, but Yang Sifu's reaction shows that he has no tolerance for me." Yang responded, "Zheng Tan stated that the governance is deteriorating year by year. This does not only incriminate your subject, but also speaks ill of your holy virtues." Yang then submitted multiple offers to resign. Soon thereafter, Zheng and Chen were stripped of their chancellor posts. Meanwhile, when Emperor Wenzong discussed with Li Jue how the start of Emperor Dezong's reign was considered one with good governance, Li Jue pointed out that the problems with the late stages of Emperor Dezong's reign was that he was extracting tributes from the circuits and that administrators were therefore able to extract additional amounts beyond the tributes. When Emperor Wenzong discussed lowering the tax burden, Li Jue endorsed the idea, arguing that that was what was done under Emperor Wenzong's highly regarded ancestor Emperor Taizong and the chancellors Fang Xuanling, Du Ruhui, Wang Gui, and Wei Zheng. It was said that Emperor Wenzong appreciated Li Jue's advice, and he created Li Jue the Baron of Zanhuang.

With Li Yong having died in 838, Emperor Wenzong's favorite concubine Consort Yang recommended Emperor Wenzong's brother Li Rong the Prince of An as the new crown prince. When Emperor Wenzong consulted the chancellors, Li Jue opposed the proposal. As a result, late in 839, Emperor Wenzong created Emperor Jingzong's youngest son Li Chengmei the Prince of Chen crown prince.

In spring 840, Emperor Wenzong became gravely ill. He had his trusted eunuchs Liu Hongyi (劉弘逸) and Xue Jileng (薛季稜) summon Yang Sifu and Li Jue to the palace, to entrust Li Chengmei to them. However, the powerful eunuchs Qiu Shiliang and Yu Hongzhi (魚弘志), who were not consulted, opposed Li Chengmei, and therefore, despite Li Jue's objection, forged an edict in Emperor Wenzong's name, demoting Li Chengmei back to being the Prince of Chen, while creating another younger brother of Emperor Wenzong's, Li Chan the Prince of Ying, crown prince. Emperor Wenzong soon died, and Li Chan became emperor (as Emperor Wuzong). At Qiu's urging, Emperor Wuzong ordered Li Rong, Li Chengmei, and Consort Yang to commit suicide.

== During Emperor Wuzong's reign ==
As Emperor Wenzong's burial was being planned, Li Jue was put in charge of overseeing the planning. As Emperor Wenzong's casket was taken to the imperial tomb, on the way, due to a pothole on the road, the wheels dropped, and Emperor Wuzong considered this Li Jue's fault and removed him from the chancellor position; Li Jue was made the minister of worship (太常卿), while the mayor of Jingzhao Municipality (京兆, i.e., the Chang'an region), Jing Xin (敬昕) was demoted to be the military advisor to the prefect of Chen Prefecture (郴州, in modern Chenzhou, Hunan). (It was said, however, that it was actually because Emperor Wuzong knew that Li Jue and Yang Sifu did not support him that they were removed from chancellor positions.) Emperor Wuzong subsequently recalled the former chancellor Li Deyu, a leader of the Li Faction (indeed, which was named after him, while the Niu faction was named after Niu Sengru), to serve as the leading chancellor. Li Jue was subsequently sent out of Chang'an to serve as the governor (觀察使, Guanchashi) of Gui District (桂管, headquartered in modern Guilin, Guangxi) and the prefect of its capital Gui Prefecture.

Meanwhile, Qiu Shiliang, who resented Liu Hongyi and Xue Jileng deeply, continued to make allegations against them, and in 841, Emperor Wuzong, believing in those allegations, ordered them to commit suicide, and also sent eunuchs to Gui Prefecture and Tan Prefecture (in modern Changsha, Hunan), where Yang was serving as the governor of Hunan Circuit (湖南), to order Yang and Li Jue to commit suicide as well. At Du Cong's urging, as Du pointed out that Emperor Wuzong should not become accustomed to killing officials so easily, Li Deyu interceded, along with Chen Yixing (who was again chancellor by this point) and other chancellors Cui Gong and Cui Dan. Emperor Wuzong relented, and both Yang and Li Jue were spared of their lives, but further exiled — in Li Jue's case, to be the prefect of Zhao Prefecture (昭州, also in modern Guilin).

== During Emperor Xuānzong's reign ==
In 846, Emperor Wuzong died and was succeeded by his uncle Emperor Xuānzong. Emperor Xuānzong, who despised Li Deyu, sent him out of the capital, and began to move the five chancellors that Emperor Wuzong had exiled — Niu Sengru, Li Zongmin, Cui Gong, Yang Sifu, and Li Jue — closer to the capital. In Li Jue's case, he was made the prefect of Chen Prefecture. In 848, Li Jue was recalled to Chang'an to serve as the minister of census (戶部尚書, Hubu Shangshu). He subsequently served stints as the military governor of Heyang Circuit and minister of civil service affairs (吏部尚書, Libu Shangshu), before eventually serving as the military governor of Huainan Circuit (淮南, headquartered in modern Yangzhou, Jiangsu). He was also created the Duke of Zanhuang. He died in 852, or possibly 853, and was given posthumous honors.

== Notes and references ==
- Old Book of Tang, vol. 173.
- New Book of Tang, vol. 182.
- Zizhi Tongjian, vols. 241, 245, 246, 248.
