= Cui Dan =

Cui Dan (崔鄲) was an official of the Chinese Tang dynasty, serving as a chancellor during the reigns of Emperor Wenzong and Emperor Wenzong's brother Emperor Wuzong.

== Background ==
It is not known when Cui Dan was born. He was from the "Lesser Branch" of the prominent Cui clan of Qinghe (清河, in modern Xingtai, Hebei), and his ancestors originally claimed ancestry from the ruling house of the Spring and Autumn period state Qi. Cui Dan's traceable ancestry included officials of Han dynasty (including Cui Yan), Liu Song, Northern Wei, and the Tang dynasties. His grandfather Cui Ji (崔佶) served as a staff member for a crown prince, while his father Cui Chui (崔陲) served as a deputy chief imperial censor.

Cui Dan had at least seven brothers — older brothers Cui Bin (崔邠), Cui Feng (崔鄷), Cui Yan (崔郾), Cui Xun (崔郇), Cui Han (崔邯), and Cui Shan (崔鄯), and younger brother Cui Fu (崔鄜). Among the brothers, Cui Bin was the most well-known and one whose acts were most well-recorded in the official histories Old Book of Tang and New Book of Tang. Six of the brothers would eventually reach high level positions within the Tang government.

== Career before chancellorship ==
Cui Dan's biographies in the Old Book of Tang and the New Book of Tang had different descriptions of his career path, both agreed that he passed the imperial examinations in the Jinshi class. The Old Book of Tang mentioned that he served in an unspecified office before serving as an imperial censor with the title Jiancha Yushi (監察御史) and then as Kaogong Langzhong (考功郎中), a supervisory official at the ministry of civil service affairs (吏部, Libu). According to the Old Book of Tang, then, in 829, during the reign of Emperor Wenzong, while remaining as Kaogong Langzhong, he was also made an imperial scholar (翰林學士, Hanlin Xueshi), and thereafter was made Zhongshu Sheren (中書舍人), a mid-level official at the legislative bureau of government (中書省, Zhongshu Sheng). As of 832, he was no longer imperial scholar. The New Book of Tang, while discussing the same period of his career, mentioned that after he passed the imperial examinations, he served as the sheriff of Weinan County (渭南, in modern Weinan, Shaanxi), and after some promotions became Xingbu Langzhong (刑部郎中), a supervisory official at the ministry of justice (刑部, Xingbu). He subsequently served as the deputy military governor under the former chancellor Du Yuanying, the military governor (Jiedushi) of Xichuan Circuit (西川, headquartered in modern Chengdu, Sichuan). After that, Cui was recalled to the capital Chang'an to serve as the deputy minister of public works (工部侍郎, Gongbu Shilang), and an imperial scholar at Jixian Hall (集賢殿) — an event that the Old Book of Tang also described and placed in 834, while further mentioning at that time, he was also made acting minister of rites (禮部尚書, Libu Shangshi).

The two biographies' description of Cui's career thereafter did not significantly diverge. According to the Old Book of Tang, he thereafter served as deputy minister of defense (兵部侍郎, Bingbu Shilang), and also was put in charge of selecting officials for the eastern capital Luoyang. When Emperor Wenzong once summoned the officials in selecting of commissioning officials to discuss with them the criteria for selecting officials. During that conversation, he asked Cui what Cui would do with candidates who were not capable; Cui responded that he would send them to the border regions, a response that Emperor Wenzong did not agree with, pointing out that that meant that the people living on the borders would be mistreated. Nevertheless, he subsequently made Cui the deputy minister of civil service affairs (吏部侍郎, Libu Shilang). In 837, Cui was sent out of Chang'an to serve as the governor (觀察使, Guanchashi) of Xuanshe Circuit (宣歙, headquartered in modern Xuancheng, Anhui), as well as the prefect of its capital Xuan Prefecture (宣州). In 839, he was recalled to Chang'an to serve as the minister of worship (太常卿, Taichang Qing).

== Chancellorship ==
In fall 839, Cui Dan, while still serving as the minister of worship, was made a chancellor de facto with the designation Tong Zhongshu Menxia Pingzhangshi (同中書門下平章事). He thereafter was also made Zhongshu Shilang (中書侍郎), the deputy head of the legislative bureau, and given the honorary title Yinqing Guanglu Daifu (銀青光祿大夫). After Emperor Wenzong died in 840 and was succeeded by his brother Emperor Wuzong, although Cui's colleagues Yang Sifu and Li Jue were removed from their posts, and Li Deyu became the leading chancellor, Cui remained chancellor. (It was said that this was because Li Deyu and the Cui brothers had long had friendly relations.) In 841, when Emperor Wuzong came to believe in allegations that Yang and Li Jue had supported other candidates to succeed Emperor Wenzong rather than him and wanted to put Yang and Li Jue to death, Li Deyu, at the advice of Du Cong, interceded, along with Cui and their other chancellor colleagues Chen Yixing and Cui Gong, and Emperor Wuzong spared Yang and Li Jue's lives, although exiling them far away from the capital.

== Career after chancellorship ==
Late in 841, Cui Dan was sent out of Chang'an to serve as the military governor of Xichuan Circuit. Early in the subsequent reign of Emperor Wuzong's uncle Emperor Xuānzong, Cui was made the military governor of Huainan Circuit (淮南, headquartered in modern Yangzhou, Jiangsu), carrying the title of Tong Zhongshu Menxia Pingzhangshi as an honorary title. He died while still serving at Huainan, but the date of death is not known.

== Notes and references ==
- Old Book of Tang, vol. 155.
- New Book of Tang, vol. 163.
- Zizhi Tongjian, vol. 246.
