= Yang Sifu =

Yang Sifu (楊嗣復; 783–848), courtesy name Jizhi (繼之), nickname Qingmen (慶門), formally Count Xiaomu of Hongnong (弘農孝穆伯), was an official of the Chinese Tang dynasty, serving as a chancellor during the reign of Emperor Wenzong and (briefly) the reign of Emperor Wenzong's brother Emperor Wuzong. He was considered one of the leaders of the Niu Faction in the Niu-Li Factional Struggles.

== Background and early career ==
Yang Sifu was born in 783, during the reign of Emperor Dezong. His ancestors claimed origins from the royal house of Zhou dynasty, through a series of officials of the State of Jin of the Spring and Autumn period, the State of Han of the Warring States period, Qin dynasty, Han dynasty, Former Yan, Northern Wei, Western Wei, Northern Zhou, Sui dynasty, and Tang dynasty. Yang Sifu's great-grandfather Yang Guansu (楊冠俗) and grandfather Yang Taiqing (楊太清) both served at the county government level.

Yang Sifu's father Yang Yuling (楊於陵), however, would eventually become a prominent official. Prior to Yang Yuling's becoming prominent, he served a term as the sheriff of Jurong County (句容, in modern Zhenjiang, Jiangsu). The governor of Zhexi Circuit (浙西, headquartered in modern Zhenjiang), which Jurong was in, Han Huang (who would, eventually, become a chancellor), was impressed with Yang Yuling. At that time, Han was looking for a husband for his daughter, and he stated to his wife Lady Liu, "I have met many people, but none appears as primed for honors and long life as Mr. Yang. His son will be a chancellor." He thus gave his daughter to Yang Yuling in marriage. After Yang Yuling's term as the sheriff of Jurong for a time, he stayed at nearby Yang Prefecture (揚州, in modern Yangzhou, Jiangsu), where Yang Sifu was born. When Han eventually was able to see Yang Sifu, he stroked Yang Sifu's head and stated, "Your name and position will exceed your father's. This is a great celebration for the Yang household." He thus nicknamed Yang Sifu "Qingmen" (meaning, "celebration at the gate"). It was said that when Yang Sifu was six or seven, he could already write well.

In 802, then-19-year-old Yang Sifu passed the imperial examinations in the Jinshi class, and the next year, he passed a special examination for those with broad knowledge and grand speech. He was thereafter made a copyeditor (校書郎, Xiaoshulang) at the Palace Library. As he passed the imperial examinations under the auspices of the chancellor Quan Deyu, as were Niu Sengru (after whom the Niu Faction would be named by later historians) and Li Zongmin, he developed deep friendships with them.

== During Emperor Xianzong's reign ==
Later, during the reign of Emperor Dezong's grandson Emperor Xianzong, it was said that because Yang Sifu became well known by the chancellor Wu Yuanheng (along with Pei Du and Liu Gongchuo (柳公綽)), Wu, while later serving as the military governor of Xichuan Circuit (西川, headquartered in modern Chengdu, Sichuan), invited them to serve on his staff. Yang was later recalled to the capital Chang'an to serve as You Shiyi (右拾遺), a low-level advisory official at the legislative bureau of government (中書省, Zhongshu Sheng), and also served as an editor of the imperial history. Because Yang was well-learned in the ceremonies, he was later made Taichang Boshi (太常博士), a scholar at the ministry of ceremonies (太常寺, Taichang Si).

By 815, Yang had become Xingbu Yuanwailang (刑部員外郎), a low-level official at the Ministry of Justice (刑部, Xingbu). At that time, the former chancellor Zheng Yuqing was commissioned to revise the ceremonies, and at his request, Yang was made his secretary for the task. Yang was also made Libu Yuanwailang (禮部員外郎), a low-level official at the Ministry of Rites. As this ministry was part of the Department of State Affairs (尚書省, Shangshu Sheng) where at that time, Yang Sifu's father Yang Yuling served as Deputy Minister at the Ministry of Revenue (戶部侍郎, Hubu Shilang) that was also part of the Department of State Affairs, Yang Sifu requested a different position to avoid suggestions of impropriety. Emperor Xianzong issued an edict in which he opined that there could be no impropriety since Yang Yuling was not his son's superior. Later, Yang Sifu was made Bingbu Langzhong (兵部郎中), a supervisory official at the Ministry of War (兵部, Bingbu).

== During Emperor Muzong's and Emperor Jingzong's reigns ==
In 821, by which time Emperor Xianzong's son Emperor Muzong was emperor, Yang Sifu was made Kubu Langzhong (庫部郎中), also a supervisory official at the ministry of defense, but was also put in charge of drafting imperial edicts. He was soon thereafter made Zhongshu Sheren (中書舍人), a mid-level official at the legislative bureau.

By 824, Niu Sengru was a chancellor, and he wanted to see Yang also promoted, but as Yang did not want to exceed, in his post, his father Yang Yuling, who was then the defender of the eastern capital Luoyang and who had never been chancellor, Yang was not made chancellor but was made acting minister of rites (禮部侍郎, Libu Shilang) and put in charge of the imperial examinations. In 825, by which time Emperor Muzong's son Emperor Jingzong, Yang, in that capacity, selected the examinees for passage, and it was said that many of them later became prominent officials.

== During Emperor Wenzong's reign ==
=== Before chancellorship ===
After Emperor Jingzong was assassinated around the new year 827 and was succeeded by his brother Emperor Wenzong, Yang Sifu was made the deputy minister of census. By that point, Yang Yuling had retired, and was old and ill. Yang Sifu requested to resign so that he could attend to his father, but Emperor Wenzong did not accept his resignation. After Yang Yuling died in 830, Yang Sifu left government service to observe a mourning period for him. In 833, at which time LI Zongmin was a chancellor, Yang Sifu was recalled to government service to serve as Shangshu Zuo Cheng (尚書左丞), one of the secretaries general of the executive bureau. However, that year, Li Zongmin was removed from his chancellor post, and Li Zongmin's political enemy Li Deyu (after whom the Li Faction would be named by later historians) was the leading chancellor. Soon thereafter, Yang was sent out of the capital to serve as the military governor (Jiedushi) of Dongchuan Circuit (東川, headquartered in modern Mianyang, Sichuan), as well as the prefect of Dongchuan's capital Zi Prefecture (梓州). After Li Zongmin again became chancellor in 835, Yang was moved to the nearby (and larger) circuit Xichuan Circuit (西川, headquartered in modern Chengdu, Sichuan) and to also serve as the mayor of Xichuan's capital Chengdu Municipality.

In 837, Yang was recalled to the capital to serve as deputy minister of census, as well as the director of the salt and iron monopolies. In 838, he was made, along with Li Jue, chancellors de facto with the designation Tong Zhongshu Menxia Pingzhangshi (同中書門下平章事). He was also created the Count of Hongnong. (Emperor Wenzong's favorite concubine Consort Yang might have been a sister of Yang Yuling's, making her an aunt, and in an allegation that Emperor Wenzong's brother Emperor Wuzong would later make against her (posthumously) and Yang Sifu, he stated that Yang Sifu had written her a letter in which he referred to her as aunt, although in the same allegation, he referred to a younger brother of hers as Yang Xuansi (楊玄思), and it would have been somewhat unusual, although not highly so, for Yang Xuansi and Yang Yuling to be brothers but not share a character in their personal names.)

=== Chancellorship ===
Immediately, Yang Sifu's chancellor colleague Chen Yixing was said to despise Yang and offered to resign, but Chen's request to resign was not accepted by Emperor Wenzong. Further, as Yang advocated for Li Zongmin, who had been exiled, to be moved closer to the capital, and Chen and another chancellor, Zheng Tan, both opposed. It was said that from this point, Yang and Li Jue were often in a factional struggle against Chen and Zheng, causing Emperor Wenzong to be unable to rule on their proposals easily.

In 839, there was a major argument that led to the removals of Chen and Zheng. Emperor Wenzong had praised the talents of the acting director of finances, Du Cong. Yang and Li Jue thereafter recommended Du to be the ministry of census. Chen responded, "Such orders should come from the Emperor. In the past, those who lost stately sovereignty did so by losing their authorities to their subjects." Li Jue responded, "Your Imperial Majesty had told me previously that an Emperor should select chancellors, not suspect them." In a subsequent discussion, Chen again emphasized that the Emperor should not yield authority to his subjects. Li Jue, offended, responded, "Chen Yixing is obviously suspecting that there are chancellors who are stealing power from Your Imperial Majesty. I have often requested retirement, and I would be fortunate to be given a post as an imperial prince's teacher." Zheng then stated, "Your Imperial Majesty ruled well in the first and second years of the Kaicheng era [(i.e., 836 and 837)], while less so in the third and fourth years of Kaicheng [(i.e., 838 and 839)]." Yang responded, "In the first and second years, Zheng Tan and Chen Yixing were in power. In the third and fourth years, your subject and Li Jue joined them. Of course, the crime is mine." He then stated, "I do not dare to again enter the Office of the Chancellors!" He withdrew from Emperor Wenzong's presence. Emperor Wenzong subsequently sent a eunuch to comfort him, and Zheng partially apologized, stating, "Your subject is foolish. I did not intend to point at Yang Sifu, but Yang Sifu's reaction shows that he has no tolerance for me." Yang responded, "Zheng Tan stated that the governance is deteriorating year by year. This does not only incriminate your subject, but also speaks ill of your holy virtues." Yang then submitted multiple offers to resign. Soon thereafter, Zheng and Chen were stripped of their chancellor posts. It was said that from this point on, the imperial governance was largely in Yang's hands, and he was made, in addition to chancellor, Menxia Shilang (門下侍郎), the deputy head of the examination bureau (門下省, Menxia Sheng). When the official Wei Wen (韋溫) argued that capable administrators should not be given high positions unless they had honored origins, Yang pointed out that this would lead to incompetence in the government, like what happened during Jin dynasty.

Meanwhile, by this point, Emperor Wenzong's son and crown prince Li Yong had died, and Consort Yang advocated having Emperor Wenzong's younger brother Li Rong the Prince of An made crown prince. (In Emperor Wuzong's later statements, he alleged that Yang Sifu supported Consort Yang in this attempt.) When Emperor Wenzong consulted the chancellors, however, Li Jue opposed. Emperor Wenzong thus made the youngest son of Emperor Jingzong's, Li Chengmei the Prince of Chen, crown prince.

In spring 840, Emperor Wenzong became gravely ill. He had his trusted eunuchs Liu Hongyi (劉弘逸) and Xue Jileng (薛季稜) summon Yang Sifu and Li Jue to the palace, to entrust Li Chengmei to them. However, the powerful eunuchs Qiu Shiliang and Yu Hongzhi (魚弘志), who were not consulted, opposed Li Chengmei, and therefore forged an edict in Emperor Wenzong's name, demoting Li Chengmei back to being the Prince of Chen, while creating another younger brother of Emperor Wenzong's, Li Chan the Prince of Ying, crown prince. Emperor Wenzong soon died, and Li Chan became emperor (as Emperor Wuzong). At Qiu's urging, Emperor Wuzong ordered Li Rong, Li Chengmei, and Consort Yang to commit suicide. During the brief mourning period, Yang Sifu served as regent.

== During Emperor Wuzong's reign ==
Soon after Emperor Wuzong took the throne, Yang Sifu was removed from his chancellor position and made the minister of civil service affairs (吏部尚書, Libu Shangshu), as Emperor Wuzong knew that Yang and Li Jue, who was likewise removed, did not support him. Later that year, after Emperor Wuzong recalled Li Deyu to serve as chancellor, Yang was sent out of the capital to serve as the governor (觀察使, Guanchashi) of Hunan Circuit (湖南, headquartered in modern Changsha, Hunan).

Meanwhile, Qiu Shiliang, who resented Liu Hongyi and Xue Jileng deeply, continued to make allegations against them, and in 841, Emperor Wuzong, believing in those allegations, ordered them to commit suicide, and also sent eunuchs to Hunan's capital Tang Prefecture, and Gui Prefecture (桂州, in modern Guilin, Guangxi), where Li Jue was serving as the governor of Gui District, to order Yang and Li Jue to commit suicide as well. (In the allegations that Emperor Wuzong came to believe, Yang had urged Consort Yang to become regent, like Wu Zetian did.) At Du Cong's urging, as Du pointed out that Emperor Wuzong should not become accustomed to killing officials so easily, Li Deyu interceded, along with Chen Yixing (who was again chancellor by this point) and other chancellors Cui Gong and Cui Dan. Emperor Wuzong relented, and both Yang and Li Jue were spared of their lives, but further exiled — in Yang's case, to be the prefect of Chao Prefecture (潮州, in modern Chaozhou, Guangdong).

== During Emperor Xuānzong's reign ==
In 846, Emperor Wuzong died and was succeeded by his uncle Emperor Xuānzong. Emperor Xuānzong, who despised Li Deyu, sent him out of the capital, and began to move the five chancellors that Emperor Wuzong had exiled — Niu Sengru, Li Zongmin, Cui Gong, Yang Sifu, and Li Jue — closer to the capital. In Yang's case, he was made the prefect of Jiang Prefecture (江州, in modern Nanchang, Jiangxi). Apparently, soon thereafter, Emperor Xuānzong further ordered Yang recalled to serve as the minister of civil service affairs. In 848, as Yang was on the way back to Chang'an, he died at Yue Prefecture (岳州, in modern Yueyang, Hunan). He was given posthumous honors.

== Personal Information ==
=== Sons ===
Yang Shou, Yang Sun, Yang Ji, Yang Shi, Yang Zong (杨授、杨损、杨技、杨拭、杨捴).

=== Grandson ===
Yang Jiong (杨煚), son of Yang Shou.

== Notes and references ==
- Old Book of Tang, vol. 176.
- New Book of Tang, vol. 174.
- Zizhi Tongjian, vols. 246, 248.
