= Li Rong (prince) =

Chinese prince

Li Rong (李溶) (813-February 12, 840), formally the Prince of An (安王), was an imperial prince of the Chinese Tang dynasty, being a son of Emperor Muzong.

== Background ==
Li Rong was born on 813. He was the eighth son of Emperor Muzong, while his mother was an imperial consort surnamed Yang that outlived his father. In 821, when Emperor Muzong created his sons, as well as a number of younger brothers who had not been created titles, imperial princes, Li Rong was created the Prince of An. In 834, by which time another older brother, Emperor Wenzong was emperor, Li Rong was given the honorific title Kaifu Yitong Sansi (開府儀同三司). Early in Emperor Wenzong's Kaicheng era (836-840), Emperor Wenzong ordered that monthly stipends be given to both Li Rong and Li Chan (who was then the Prince of Ying), and it was said that Emperor Wenzong often treated both him and Li Chan well and more special than other imperial princes.

== Consideration as Emperor Wenzong's successor ==
In 838, Emperor Wenzong's only living son and crown prince Li Yong died — probably murdered by household servants. After Li Yong's death, in 839, Emperor Wenzong's concubine Consort Yang recommended Li Rong as crown prince. (Li Chan, after he became emperor (as Emperor Wuzong), would state that it was his belief that Li Rong flattered Consort Yang, and that Li Rong's candidacy was supported by the chancellor Yang Sifu (who might have been Consort Yang's nephew) and the eunuch Liu Hongyi (劉弘逸), with Yang Sifu's having an eye toward having Consort Yang becoming empress dowager and regent. It is not known whether Li Chan's beliefs were correct.) When Emperor Wenzong consulted the chancellors, however, Li Jue opposed Li Rong's candidacy. Emperor Wenzong thereafter created his older brother Emperor Jingzong's youngest son Li Chengmei the Prince of Chen crown prince.

== Death ==
In spring 840, Emperor Wenzong became seriously ill. He summoned Liu Hongyi and another eunuch, Xue Jileng (薛季稜), and asked them to summon Yang Sifu and Li Jue to the palace, ready to entrust Li Chengmei to them. However, the eunuch army commanders Qiu Shiliang and Yu Hongzhi (魚弘志), hoping to receive credit for supporting a new emperor, opposed Li Chengmei, arguing that Li Chengmei was too young and too sickly. Li Jue tried to stop them, but Qiu and Yu went ahead and issued an edict in Emperor Wenzong's name demoting Li Chengmei back to the Prince of Chen and creating Li Chan crown prince instead. After Emperor Wenzong soon died, Qiu persuaded Li Chan, who had not yet taken the throne and was still using his title of crown prince, to order Consort Yang, Li Rong, and Li Chengmei to commit suicide.

== Notes and references ==
- Old Book of Tang, vol. 175.
- New Book of Tang, vol. 82.
- Zizhi Tongjian, vols. 241, 246.
