= Li Shi (Tang dynasty) =

Li Shi (李石), courtesy name Zhongyu (中玉), formally the Count of Longxi (隴西伯), was a Chinese politician of the Tang dynasty, serving as a chancellor during the reign of Emperor Wenzong. He was credited with stabilizing the political scene in the aftermaths of the Ganlu incident, a failed attempt by Emperor Wenzong to slaughter the powerful eunuchs.

== Background ==
It is not known when Li Shi was born. He was a member of the Tang imperial Li clan, as his ancestry came from Li Liang (李亮), one of the sons of Li Hu (李虎), the father of Tang's founding emperor Emperor Gaozu. His grandfather Li Jian (李堅) served as a prefectural prefect, while his father Li Peng (李鵬) served as a county magistrate.

== Early career ==
In 818, during the reign of Emperor Xianzong, Li Shi passed the imperial examinations in the Jinshi class. As of 822, during the reign of Emperor Xianzong's son Emperor Muzong, Li Shi was serving as a staff member under Tian Bu the military governor of Weibo Circuit (魏博, headquartered in modern Handan, Hebei). That year, when Tian, loyal to the imperial government but facing soldiers ready to mutiny against him for being loyal, felt he had no choice but to commit suicide, he wrote a final petition urging immediately imperial assistance to two other generals loyal to the imperial government, Li Guangyan and Niu Yuanyi (牛元翼) and entrusted the petition to Li Shi, before committing suicide.

After Tian's death, Li Shi served on the staff of Li Ting (李聽) the Duke of Liang, and he followed Li Ting at four different circuits. It was said that Li Shi was good at speaking and had strategies, and was particularly capable in his administrative skills. Whenever Li Ting was out conducting campaigns, Li Shi often remained at headquarters to oversee operations in Li Ting's absence.

== During Emperor Wenzong's reign ==
=== Before chancellorship ===
In 829, by which time Emperor Muzong's son Emperor Wenzong was emperor, when Li Ting was serving as the military governor of Yicheng Circuit (義成, headquartered in modern Anyang, Henan), there was an occasion when Li Ting sent Li Shi to the capital Chang'an to submit reports. When Li Shi met Emperor Wenzong, he spoke well, impressing Emperor Wenzong. Subsequently, Emperor Wenzong recalled Li Shi to Chang'an to serve as Gongbu Langzhong (工部郎中), a supervisory official at the ministry of public works (工部, Gongbu), and also had him serve as acting director of the salt and iron monopolies. In 831, Li Shi was made Xingbu Langzhong (刑部郎中), a supervisory official at the ministry of justice (刑部, Xingbu). Subsequently, when Linghu Chu served as the military governor of Hedong Circuit (河東, headquartered in modern Taiyuan, Shanxi), at his request, Li Shi was made his deputy military governor. In 834, Li Shi was made an imperial attendant (給事中, Jishizhong). In summer 835, Li Shi was made acting mayor of Jingzhao Municipality (i.e., the Chang'an region). In winter 835, he was made the deputy minister of census (戶部侍郎, Hubu Shilang), and was also acting director of finances. (This was done to allow the deputy mayor Luo Liyan (羅立言), a close associate of the chancellor Li Xun, who was plotting with Emperor Wenzong and Zheng Zhu to slaughter the powerful eunuchs, to serve as acting mayor and control the troops under the mayor's command.)

Soon thereafter, the plot by Emperor Wenzong, Li Xun, and Zheng Zhu (later known as the Ganlu Incident) failed, with the eunuchs slaughtering many imperial officials, including Li Xun, Zheng, and three of Li Xun's chancellor colleagues — Wang Ya, Jia Su, and Shu Yuanyu. In the aftermaths of the incident, Li Shi and Zheng Tan were made chancellors with the designation Tong Zhongshu Menxia Pingzhangshi (同中書門下平章事), and Li Shi retained his authorities as the director of finances as well.

=== Chancellorship ===
At the time that Zheng Tan and Li Shi served as chancellors, the eunuchs, led by Qiu Shiliang, often tried to humiliate the imperial officials by citing the examples of Li Xun and Zheng Zhu. It was said that Li Shi and Zheng Tan responded by pointing out that Li Xun and Zheng Zhu had initially been recommended to Emperor Wenzong by the eunuch Wang Shoucheng. Thereafter, it was said that the eunuchs' arrogance subsided somewhat, and the imperial officials depended on Li Shi and Zheng Tan to protect them. Soon thereafter, there was an incident in which, when the eunuch Tian Quancao (田全操) returned to the capital, he had remarked that when he got to the capital he would slaughter the officials, causing a general panic in Chang'an. Zheng suggested to Li Shi that they find refuge when Tian was approaching Chang'an, but Li Shi refused, pointing out that if even the chancellors fled, the panic would overtake the capital entirely, and that if there were to be disaster, they would not be able to get away anyway. Zheng agreed. Subsequently, Zheng and Li Shi urged that the relatives of Li Xun and the other executed officials be no longer pursued.

Meanwhile, as many of the chancellors' guards were killed in the Ganlu Incident, the governors of Jiangxi (江西, headquartered in modern Nanchang, Jiangxi) and Hunan (湖南, headquartered in modern Changsha, Hunan) offered uniforms and salaries for 120 guards to allow the chancellors' guard corps to be reassembled. Li Shi submitted a petition to Emperor Wenzong declining the two circuits' offer:

If the chancellors are faithful and righteous, without wickedness, the gods will protect them, and even if they encountered bandits, they would not be injured. If they have wickedness and deceit inside them, even if they had grand guards, ghosts would kill them. Your subject is willing to use all of his heart for the state. Based on past regulations, it is sufficient to use the Jinwu [(金吾), part of the imperial guards] guards. I beg that you order the two circuits to take back their offers of uniforms and salaries.

(Li Shi's petition was often viewed traditionally as a model of modesty, but the modern historian Bo Yang severely criticized it for overly arrogant language that did not conform with Li Shi's own behavior several years later.)

However, the eunuchs continued to be in control of the government, and it was said that the imperial officials worried about being slaughtered on a daily basis. It was not until spring 836, when Liu Congjian the military governor of Zhaoyi Circuit (昭義, headquartered in modern Changzhi, Shanxi), submitted harshly worded petitions protesting the innocence of Wang Ya and Jia Su and accusing Qiu of crimes, did Qiu and the other eunuchs began to cut back on their behavior and allow Emperor Wenzong, as well as Li Shi and Zheng, to exercise their authority. In addition to being chancellor, Li Shi was given the office of Zhongshu Shilang (中書侍郎, the deputy head of the legislative bureau of government (中書省, Zhongshu Sheng)), as well as acting director of salt and iron monopolies, and imperial scholar at Jixian Hall (集賢殿).

In spring 836, there was an incident when there were rumors that Emperor Wenzong was prepared to give the chancellors commands of the armies to again act against the eunuchs, and tensions rose again. It was only after Li Shi proposed that Emperor Wenzong convene a meeting between the chancellors and the eunuchs, allowing Li Shi and Zheng to explain what was happening to the eunuchs, that Qiu and the others were less suspicious of the chancellors.

Also in 836, with Li Guyan, a former chancellor, serving again as chancellor with Zheng and Li Shi, Li Shi advocated the posthumous rehabilitation of the former chancellor Song Shenxi, whom Wang Shoucheng and Zheng Zhu had previously accused of treason, leading to Song's exile. Zheng and Li Guyan joined Li Shi in his petition, and Emperor Wenzong agreed, restoring Song's offices posthumously.

Meanwhile, Li Shi had commissioned the official Han Yi (韓益) to take over, on an acting basis, his responsibilities as director of finances, but Han was corrupt and, after the corruption was discovered, was imprisoned. Li Shi stated to Emperor Wenzong, "I thought that Han Yi was familiar with monetary and food supply matters, and that was why I used him. I did not know that he is this greedy." Emperor Wenzong responded, "Chancellors are supposed to use those whom they know the abilities of and punish those who have faults. Only then can you find capable people. You, Lord, do not hide the wickedness of those you commissioned, and this is righteousness. In the past, when chancellors commissioned people, they often hid their faults and stopped them from being indicted. That was a major problem." Subsequently, Han was exiled. Li Shi also suggested that Emperor Wenzong show greater favor to two eunuchs who were virtuous, Liu Hongyi (劉弘逸) and Xue Jileng (薛季稜).

As Li Shi had been willing to stand up to the eunuchs on policy issues, Qiu began to resent him deeply. In 838, Qiu sent assassins to try to kill Li Shi, but the assassination failed. Despite the failure, Li Shi became fearful and offered to resign his chancellor position. Emperor Wenzong reluctantly agreed, making Li Shi the military governor of Jingnan Circuit (荊南, headquartered in modern Jingzhou, Hubei) instead, as well as the mayor of Jingnan's capital Jiangling Municipality (江陵).

=== After chancellorship ===
As it was commonly known that Qiu Shiliang resented Li Shi, when Li Shi was departing Chang'an to head to Jingnan, no imperial feast was held in his honor, causing much distress among the gentlemen of the capital. When Li Shi arrived at Jingnan, where he continued to carry the Tong Zhongshu Menxia Pingzhangshi title as an honorary title, he declined the honorary title of Zhongshu Shilang.

== During Emperor Wuzong's reign ==
After Emperor Wenzong died in 840 and was succeeded by his brother Emperor Wuzong, Emperor Wuzong bestowed the additional honorary title of acting You Pushe (右僕射) on Li Shi.

In 843, in the middle of Emperor Wuzong's campaign against the warlord Liu Zhen, who controlled Zhaoyi Circuit (昭義, headquartered in modern Changzhi, Shanxi), Emperor Wuzong, concerned that there was resentment between two of Zhaoyi's nearby circuit governors — Liu Mian (劉沔) the military governor of Hedong and Zhang Zhongwu the military governor of Lulong Circuit (盧龍, headquartered in modern Beijing), moved Liu to Yicheng Circuit and made Li Shi the military governor of Hedong to replace Liu. Li Shi was also made acting Sikong (司空, one of the Three Excellencies) and the mayor of Hedong's capital Taiyuan. He was created the Count of Longxi as well, and allowed to continue to carry the honorary title of Tong Zhongshu Menxia Pingzhangshi.

When Liu departed Hedong, he took all the stored wealth in the Hedong treasury with him, so upon Li Shi's arrival, the treasury was empty. Meanwhile, under orders of the imperial government to supply additional forces on the Zhaoyi front, Li Shi recalled 1,500 soldiers that Liu had previously been stationed along the Hengshui Palisade (橫水柵, in modern Datong, Shanxi) to defend against Uyghur raiders, under the command of the officer Yang Bian (楊弁). Three days before the Chinese New Year, the Hengshui Fence soldiers arrived, but as the circuit treasury was empty, Li Shi could not give them the silk rewards that the soldiers being sent on a campaign were accustomed to receive; rather, he had to take silk out of his own personal wealth, but was only able to pay half as much. Further, the eunuch monitor Lü Yizhong (呂義忠), then with Wang Zai, was sending messages forcing the soldiers to get underway without staying at Taiyuan for New Year. The soldiers were angry and distressed, and Yang took this opportunity to start an uprising. He had the soldiers pillage the city and take control of the city of Taiyuan. Li Shi was forced to flee to Fen Prefecture (汾州, in modern Linfen, Shanxi). Yang subsequently entered into an alliance with Liu Zhen.

In light of Yang's uprising, there were immediate calls among the imperial officials to stop the campaign against Zhaoyi, and even Wang Zai was calling for accepting Liu's surrender. The chancellor Li Deyu opposed, and again reiterated that Liu's surrender should only be accepted if he and his family bound themselves. Under further advice by Li Deyu, who argued that Yang's uprising could not be tolerated, Emperor Wuzong ordered that the focus of the campaign be shifted, to concentrate on Yang first. To those ends, he ordered Li Shi and Lü to gather troops from nearby prefectures and try to recapture Taiyuan, while ordering Wang Feng to leave Hedong troops at Yushe and instead take troops previously sent by Yiwu (義武, headquartered in modern Baoding, Hebei), Xuanwu, and Yanhai (兗海, headquartered in modern Jining, Shandong) Circuits to head toward Taiyuan. He also ordered Wang Yuankui to divert troops toward Taiyuan as well. This set a panic into the Hedong soldiers at Yushe, who were fearful that the soldiers from other circuits would slaughter their families if Taiyuan fell, so they volunteered to attack Yang with Lü as their commander. In less than a month after Yang took over Taiyuan, the Hedong troops under Lü recaptured the city and arrested Yang, who was subsequently delivered to Chang'an and executed.

After Yang's rebellion was put down, Li Shi was replaced with Cui Yuanshi. He was thereafter made an advisor to the Crown Prince, but to have his office at the eastern capital Luoyang. In 845, he was made acting Situ (司徒, one of the Three Excellencies), as well as the defender of Luoyang. He died while at Luoyang at the age of 61, but the date of death was not specified.

== Notes and references ==
- Old Book of Tang, vol. 172.
- New Book of Tang, vol. 131.
- Zizhi Tongjian, vols. 242, 245, 246, 247.
