= Liu Zhen (Tang dynasty) =

Chinese general during the Tang dynasty

Liu Zhen (劉稹; died September 27, 844) was a Chinese rebel during the Tang dynasty. He was an adopted son (biological nephew) of the Tang dynasty general Liu Congjian. After his adoptive father's death, Liu Zhen tried to take over Zhaoyi Circuit (昭義, headquartered in modern Changzhi, Shanxi), which Liu Congjian had governed as military governor (jiedushi), without approval from Emperor Wuzong. When Emperor Wuzong declared a general campaign against him, he was defeated, and he was subsequently killed, along with his clan members, by his own officer Guo Yi (郭誼).

== Background ==
It is not known when Liu Zhen was born. His grandfather Liu Wu had been an officer under the brothers Li Shigu and Li Shidao, who were successive warlords who ruled Pinglu Circuit (平盧, headquartered in modern Tai'an, Shandong). During an imperial campaign against Li Shidao, Liu killed Li Shidao and surrendered to the imperial army. Liu Wu was subsequently made the military governor (jiedushi) of Zhaoyi Circuit. Liu Wu and Liu Zhen's uncle Liu Congjian subsequently successively ruled Zhaoyi.

Liu Zhen's biological father Liu Congsu (劉從素) served as a general of the imperial guards. At some point, for reasons lost to history, Liu Congjian adopted Liu Zhen to be his son. (According to Liu Congjian's biography in the New Book of Tang, Liu Congjian had some 20 sons, but they were all still children at the time of his death.)

In 843, Liu Congjian, whose relationship with the nearby circuit military governors and relationship with the imperial government had not been good (because of his rivalry with the powerful eunuch Qiu Shiliang, with whose support then-reigning Emperor Wuzong had been able to become emperor), was gravely ill. Liu Congjian was fearful that if someone other than a family member succeeded him, his family would be slaughtered, and therefore planned to have Liu Zhen succeed him. He put Liu Zhen, another nephew Liu Kuangzhou (劉匡周), the household servant Li Shigui (李士貴), as well as officers Wang Xie (王協), Liu Shouyi (劉守義), Liu Chenzhong (劉襯忠), Dong Kewu (董可武), and Cui Xuandu (崔玄度) in charge of various key posts at the circuit headquarters. He soon died, but Liu Zhen did not announce his death, but, at Wang's suggestion, sent the officer Jiang Yin (姜崟) to the imperial government stating that Liu Congjian was merely ill, and further forced the imperial eunuch monitor of the army, Cui Shikang (崔士康), to submit a petition recommending that Liu Zhen be named acting military governor due to Liu Congjian's illness.

Emperor Wuzong believed that Liu Congjian was dead, and asked the chancellors and advisory officials for their opinions. Most of them believed that, given that Tang was facing incursions from remnants of the Uyghur Khanate (which had recently broken apart after attacks by the Xiajiasi), a reconciliatory stance should be taken toward Zhaoyi and that Liu Zhen should be allowed to take over. Lead chancellor Li Deyu disagreed, pointing out that Zhaoyi was isolated, and that as long as three circuits traditionally in de facto independence from the imperial government—Weibo (魏博, headquartered in modern Handan, Hebei), then ruled by He Hongjing; Chengde (成德, headquartered in modern Shijiazhuang, Hebei), then ruled by Wang Yuankui; and Lulong (盧龍, headquartered in modern Beijing), then ruled by Zhang Zhongwu—did not support Liu Zhen, Liu Zhen could not stand against imperial forces. He advocated sending the official Li Hui to those circuits to urge them to support the imperial side by pointing out that Zhaoyi was not in the same situation as they were, implicitly guaranteeing imperial noninterference with them if they assisted against Zhaoyi.

Emperor Wuzong agreed and sent the eunuchs Jie Chaozheng (解朝政) and Xue Shigan (薛士幹) to Zhaoyi to demand to see Liu Congjian, to force the issue. When Jie arrived at Zhaoyi, Liu Zhen continued to maintain that Liu Congjian was ill and not seeing any guests. Liu Zhen sent another officer, Liang Shuwen (梁叔文) to the capital Chang'an to again seek to allow his succession, while a number of other officers, led by Guo Yi, pressured Cui Shikang to go along with the proposal. Eventually, Liu Zhen announced Liu Congjian's death. Emperor Wuzong reacted by suspending the imperial gatherings to mourn Liu Congjian's death and granting him posthumous honours, while ordering Liu Zhen to escort Liu Congjian's casket to the eastern capital Luoyang. He also met Liu Congsu and ordered Liu Congsu to write Liu Zhen to persuade him to accept the imperial orders. Liu Zhen refused. In response, on June 14, 843, Emperor Wuzong stripped Liu Zhen and Liu Congjian of all of their titles and ordered a general campaign against Liu Zhen, mobilizing five circuits around Zhaoyi—Weibo; Chengde; Hedong (河東, headquartered in modern Taiyuan, Shanxi), then governed by Liu Mian (劉沔); Hezhong (河中, headquartered in modern Yuncheng, Shanxi), then governed by Chen Yixing; and Heyang (河陽, headquartered in modern Jiaozuo, Henan), then governed by Wang Maoyuan (王茂元). Subsequently, Emperor Wuzong put Li Yanzuo (李彥佐) the military governor of Wuning Circuit (武寧, headquartered in modern Xuzhou, Jiangsu) in command of the Hezhong troops. It was said that this move caught Zhaoyi by surprise, as in the past it had been expected that the imperial government would make further attempts at reconciliation before ordering a general campaign.

== Campaign against imperial forces ==
The imperial battle plan had the various military governors target the five prefectures of Zhaoyi Circuit—having Wang Yuankui targeting Xing Prefecture (邢州, in modern Xingtai, Hebei); He Hongjing targeting Ming Prefecture (洺州, in modern Handan); Wang Maoyuan targeting Ze Prefecture (澤州, in modern Jincheng, Shanxi); and Li Yanzuo and Liu Mian targeting Zhaoyi's capital Lu Prefecture. However, while Wang Yuankui launched his troops immediately, Li Yanzuo was said to have reported slowly to the front, causing Emperor Wuzong to, at Li Deyu's suggestion, reprimand him, and commissioning Shi Xiong as his deputy and eventually have Shi take over the command of the Hezhong army altogether. Meanwhile, Liu Zhen submitted a petition defending himself, proclaiming his faithfulness to the imperial government and claiming that he was only resisting because of his fear of Qiu Shiliang. He Hongjing also tried to speak on his behalf, but Emperor Wuzong rejected these pleas.

With He Hongjing delaying the launch of his troops, Emperor Wuzong, at Li Deyu's suggestion, pressured He Hongjing by ordering Wang Zai the military governor of Zhongwu Circuit (忠武, headquartered in modern Xuchang, Henan) to join the campaign, targeting Ci Prefecture (磁州, in modern Handan)—and, in doing so, cutting through Weibo territory. This order surprised He Hongjing, who was fearful of Wang Zai's entry into his territory, and therefore he tried to head off imperial pressure by launching his troops thereafter.

Meanwhile, a substantial part of Wang Maoyuan's troops, under his officer Ma Ji (馬繼), were stationed at Kedou Camp (科斗寨, in modern Jincheng). The Zhaoyi officer Xue Maoqing (薛茂卿) quickly attacked and captured Kedou Camp, taking Ma and other officers captive, and advancing toward Heyang's Huai Prefecture (懷州, in modern Jiaozuo, Henan)—but Xue halted because he did not have orders from Liu Zhen to advance further. The imperial government quickly diverted Wang Zai's troops to try to aid Heyang instead. At the same time, Zhaoyi troops under Zhang Ju (張巨) put Wang Maoyuan, who had become ill by this time, under siege at Wanshan (萬善, in modern Jiaozuo). The siege failed when Yicheng Circuit (義成, headquartered in modern Anyang, Henan) troops arrived to aid Wang Maoyuan, however. After Wang Maoyuan died soon thereafter, Wang Zai was also put in charge of Heyang forces, even though the military governorship of Heyang went to Jing Xin (敬昕). Meanwhile, Shi had taken over the Hezhong troops and was quickly capturing several Zhaoyi outposts. Also, Emperor Wuzong, with Liu Mian and Zhang Zhongwu having a poor relationship due to their conflicts stemming from the earlier campaign against the displaced Uyghurs, Emperor Wuzong moved Liu Mian to Yicheng Circuit and made the former chancellor Li Shi the new military governor of Hedong.

With his victory at Kedou Camp, Xue expected that Liu Zhen would reward him, but Liu Zhen, believing the words of some that it was Xue's victory that aggravated the imperial government, did not do so. In anger, Xue secretly contacted Wang Zai to offer to surrender. When Xue subsequently withdrew to Ze Prefecture and further secretly suggested Wang Zai to advance quickly toward Ze Prefecture, though, Wang Zai did not do so, believing that it was a trap. Xue's contacts with Wang Zai were then discovered, and Liu Zhen summoned him back to Lu Prefecture and killed him, along with his family. He had Liu Gongzhi replace Xue at the Ze Prefecture front. He also had Li Shi's cousin Li Tian (李恬), who was then the prefect of Ming Prefecture, write a letter to Li Shi, stating that Liu Zhen was willing to surrender to Li Shi. He then had his officer Jia Qun (賈群) deliver the letter to Hedong. Li Shi put Jia under arrest and relayed the letter to the imperial government. At Li Deyu's suggestion, Emperor Wuzong ordered Li Shi to respond that surrender would only be accepted if Liu Zhen and his family bound themselves at the border. Liu Zhen did not respond to this, and the campaign continued.

Liu Zhen's hopes were raised, when, on Chinese New Year 844 (January 24), soldiers that Li Shi was ordered to send to the front to reinforce the Hedong soldiers already attacking Zhaoyi, angry that they were forced to do so at New Year time and that they had not received what they felt were adequate rewards to do so, rebelled at Hedong's capital Taiyuan Municipality (太原) under the leadership of the officer Yang Bian (楊弁), forcing Li Shi to flee. Yang released Jia from captivity and had him return to Zhaoyi, pledging to be sworn brothers with Liu Zhen. In the aftermaths of Yang's rebellion, there were much discussion among imperial officials that the imperial government should end the campaign against Liu Zhen. Wang Zai, in particular, sent messengers to Zhaoyi to see if Liu Zhen would be willing to surrender. (Li Deyu later suggested to Emperor Wuzong that this was because of two reasons—that Wang Zai's father Wang Zhixing had previously falsely accused Shi of crimes and Wang was therefore fearful that Shi would gain great honors by capturing Liu Zhen; and that Wang Zai's biological son Wang Yanshi (王晏實), whom Wang Zhixing adopted as a son, was then the prefect of Ci Prefecture and was being held hostage by Liu Zhen.) At Li Deyu's suggestion, Emperor Wuzong refused Wang Zai's suggestion of accepting Liu Zhen's surrender, and ordered the Hedong soldiers under the officer Wang Feng (王逢), as well as soldiers sent by Yiwu (義武, headquartered in modern Baoding, Hebei), Xuanwu (宣武, headquartered in modern Kaifeng, Henan), and Yanhai (兗海, headquartered in modern Jining, Shandong) Circuits to attack Yang, followed up by troops from Wang Yuankui's Chengde Circuit. The Hedong soldiers under Wang Feng, worried that if the other circuits' soldiers captured Taiyuan first that their own family members would be killed, volunteered to attack quickly under the command of the eunuch monitor Lü Yizhong (呂義中), and on February 20, the Hedong soldiers recaptured Taiyuan, capturing Yang and killing many of his coconspirators.

With Wang Zai still not advancing, at Li Deyu's suggestion, Emperor Wuzong sent him an edict to urge him and pressured him by transferring Liu Mian to Heyang Circuit and having Liu Mian take the Yicheng troops to Wanshan, close to Wang Zai's camp. After one of Liu Zhen's officers, Gao Wenduan (高文端), defected to the imperial forces, he offered several key tactics on attacking Zhaoyi, based on its geography, and further suggested trying to persuade another major Zhaoyi officer, Wang Zhao (王釗), who was then helping the defense of Min Prefecture, to defect as well.

Meanwhile, it was said that Liu Zhen was young and weak in his personality, and, in effect, Wang Xie and Li Shigui were in control of the headquarters. They collected much wealth but were not willing to distribute it to the soldiers, causing morale to suffer. Liu Congjian's wife Lady Pei became concerned about the situation and wanted to recall her brother Pei Wen (裴問), who was then defending the three prefectures east of the Taihang Mountains (Xing, Min, and Ci), to the headquarters. Li Shigui, concerned that if Pei Wen returned, Pei Wen would discover his illegal acts and strip his power, and therefore advised against it, arguing that recalling Pei would lead to the fall of the three prefectures. Liu Zhen agreed and did not recall Pei Wen.

Meanwhile, though, the officer Liu Xi (劉溪), whom Wang Xie had sent to Xing Prefecture to collect taxes, angered the soldiers by arresting even their fathers and brothers, many of whom were merchants, to force them to pay taxes. When Pei Wen interceded on the soldiers' behalf and requested leniency, Liu Xi refused and was rude to him. In anger, Pei Wen and the prefect of Xing, Cui Gu (崔嘏), killed Liu Xi and surrendered Xing Prefecture to Wang Yuankui, on September 11. Wang Zhao and An Yu (安玉), hearing this, also surrendered Min and Ci Prefectures, respectively, to He Hongjing.

== Death ==
On September 26, news of the three prefectures' surrender reached the imperial capital Chang'an, and the news also reached Lu Prefecture (probably on September 26 as well), shocking the troops there. Thereafter, Guo Yi and Wang Xie began to plot to kill Liu Zhen to save their own lives. Guo, worried that Liu Kuangzhou, who served as the guard commander at headquarters, would stop any plot, convinced Liu Zhen that it was Liu Kuangzhou's presence that caused the officers to be unable to give their suggestions freely; as a result, Liu Zhen had Liu Kuangzhou leave headquarters. Guo then had Dong Kewu, whom Liu Zhen trusted, suggest that Liu transfer the control of the headquarters to Guo, while Liu Zhen himself head to the imperial territory to surrender. Liu Zhen agreed and did so under the name of Lady Pei, who had her misgivings. Li Shigui, hearing this, made an attempt to attack Guo; Guo counterattacked, and Li Shigui was killed.

The next day (probably September 27), Guo had Dong invite Liu Zhen to a feast. During the middle of the feast, Dong stated that, in order to protect the Liu clan, Liu Zhen must die. Liu Zhen agreed—and Cui Xuandu thereafter cut off his head. After Liu Zhen died, however, contrary to these words, Guo slaughtered the Liu clan, and 11 additional clans of officials that Liu Congjian had treated well. (Subsequently, after Shi Xiong arrived at Lu Prefecture, Guo and his coconspirators were arrested and delivered to Chang'an, where they were executed.)

== Notes and references ==
- Old Book of Tang, vol. 161.
- New Book of Tang, vol. 214.
- Zizhi Tongjian, vols. 247, 248.
