= Li Yong (prince) =

Crown Prince of the Tang dynasty
- Reign: 832–838
- Predecessor: vacant, Li Zhan
- Successor: Li Chengmei
- Died: 838
Posthumous name
- Crown Prince Zhuangke 莊恪太子
- Father: Emperor Wenzong of Tang

Li Yong (李永) (died November 6, 838), formally Crown Prince Zhuangke (莊恪太子), was a crown prince of the Chinese Tang dynasty. He was the oldest son of Emperor Wenzong.

== Background ==
It is not known when Li Yong was born. His mother was Emperor Wenzong's concubine Consort Wang, who eventually came to carry the title of Defei (德妃), the third highest rank for imperial consort. In summer 830, Emperor Wenzong created Li Yong the Prince of Lu. Initially, the official He Yuanliang (和元亮) served as Li Yong's teacher, but as He was a career soldier, when Emperor Wenzong met He to discuss the prince's education in 832, He was unable to respond well. Thereafter, Emperor Wenzong conferenced with the chancellors and told them, "The Prince of Lu is teachable. You should find talented scholars to serve on his staff, and not people like He Yuanliang." Thereafter, the deputy minister of census Yu Jingxiu (庾敬休) was made Li Yong's teacher; the minister of worship Zheng Su (鄭肅) was made his secretary general; and the supervisorial official Li Jianfang (李踐方) was made his military advisor. All three were allowed to keep their regular posts as well.

== As crown prince ==
Later in 832, Li Yong was created crown prince. (It was said that Emperor Wenzong waited this long to create Li Yong crown prince because he had initially to create Li Pu the Prince of Jin, the oldest son of his brother and predecessor Emperor Jingzong crown prince, but was greatly saddened when Li Pu died in 828, and therefore delayed creating a crown prince.)

Meanwhile, as of 837, the imperial attendant Wei Wen (韋溫) was also serving as Li Yong's tutor. It was said that, however, when Wei was set to tutor him in the morning, it would often been the case that he would not get to see Li Yong until the sun was high in the sky. Wei advised him:

The Crown Prince should rise when the cock crows, and he should greet the Emperor and attend to the Emperor's meal. It is inappropriate to be spending time only in feasts and games.

Li Yong did not accept Wei's advice, and Wei subsequently resigned his post as Li Yong's tutor.

== Death ==
Meanwhile, by 838, Li Yong's mother Consort Wang had died—and while the exact manner of death was not clarified in historical accounts, it was said that she was not favored by Emperor Wenzong and that Emperor Wenzong's favorite, Consort Yang, made false accusations against her, leading to her death. Despite this, Li Yong continued to spend his time on feasts and games and was close to scoundrels. Consort Yang therefore had ample opportunities to make accusations against him.

On September 29, 838, Emperor Wenzong suddenly had Li Yong arrested and convened a gathering with imperial officials, listing Li Yong's faults and intending to depose him, stating, "How can this kind of person be the Son of Heaven?" The officials largely argued that Li Yong was still young and capable of changing his ways, and that changing the crown prince position was an act that could throw the empire into disarray. Di Jianmo (狄兼謨) and Wei Wen were particularly fervent in speaking against such a change. The day after the meeting, six imperial scholars and 16 eunuch commanders of the imperial guards further submitted arguments against deposing Li Yong, causing Emperor Wenzong to change his mind. That night, Emperor Wenzong released Li Yong and allowed him to return to Shangyang Pavilion (上陽院), where the Crown Prince resided. However, tens of his attendants and eunuchs were executed or exiled.

Despite this, it was said that Li Yong was still unable to change his ways. On November 6, he died suddenly—a death that many historians, including the modern historian Bo Yang, believed, based on subsequent events, to have been an assassination by his attendants, at the implicit approval of Emperor Wenzong. He was buried with honors due a crown prince and given the posthumous name of Zhuangke (meaning "unsuccessful and respectful").

In 839, after Emperor Wenzong, who was then ill, had created Li Yong's cousin Li Chengmei (Li Pu's younger brother) crown prince, there was an occasion when Emperor Wenzong happened to see an acrobatic demonstration by a boy—and that the boy's father was worried that the boy would fall. Emperor Wenzong became touched and saddened, stating, "I am the Son of Heaven, but I could not even protect my own son!" He summoned 14 palace servants and rebuked them:

You had been the ones who harmed the Crown Prince. There is now a new Crown Prince. Do you plan to harm him, too?

Emperor Wenzong had them arrested and executed. But it was said that he was further saddened by this and became even more seriously ill. He died the following spring.

== Notes and references ==
- Old Book of Tang, vol. 175.
- New Book of Tang, vol. 82.
- Zizhi Tongjian, vols. 244, 245, 246.
