= Qutluq II =

Qaghan of the Uyghurs
- Reign: 795–808
- Predecessor: Qutluq Bilge Qaghan
- Successor: Baoyi Qaghan
- Born: Ādiē Gǔduōlù (阿跌骨咄祿)
- Died: 808
Regnal name
- Ay Tengride Ulugh Bolmish Alp Qutluq Külüg Bilge Qaghan (𐰖:𐱅𐰭𐰼𐰃𐰓𐰀:𐰆𐰞𐰍:𐰉𐰆𐰞𐰢𐱁:𐰞𐰯:𐰸𐰆𐱃𐰞𐰸:𐰚𐰇𐰠𐰏:𐰋𐰃𐰠𐰏𐰀:𐰴𐰍𐰣); Great-born at Moon God, Courageous, Blessed, Glorious, Wise Qaghan
- House: Ädiz clan (by birth); Yaglakar clan (adopted)

Alp Qutluq Külüg Bilge Qaghan — seventh qaghan of the Uyghur Khaganate and the first one from the Ädiz clan. His Tang invested title was Huaixin Qaghan (Chinese: 懷信可汗; lit. 'Cherishing', 'Sincere Qaghan').

== Biography ==
=== Life ===
Qutluq II was born in the Ädiz clan, was orphaned early in childhood and adopted by the Yaglakar clan. He quickly rose in the ranks thanks to his strategic thinking and rhetorical skill. He was appointed grand chancellor (İl Ögesi in Old Uyghur) with the title Inanchu Bilge around 782. He met the Chinese embassy bringing Tun Baga Tarkhan's uncle's body back. He was also present as the head of delegation to Chang'an in the marriage ceremony for Tun Baga Tarkhan and Princess Xian'an (咸安公主) in 788. In 790 he commanded the Uyghur army against Tibetans who were aided by the Karluk Yabghu ruler Alp Burguchan who united the Chigils, Bulaqs and Shatuo, near Beshbaliq. As a result Yang Xigu (楊襲古) Commander of Beiting Protectorate committed suicide. Although Chinese sources state that it was Inanchu who killed him in November 791. In 790 he was appointed as the regent of Qutluq Bilge Qaghan since he was a minor.

=== Reign ===
After Qutluq Bilge's death in 795 he was elected by the nobles to replace him. He didn't change his surname to his original one but kept the Yaglakar name, nevertheless he exiled all of remaining the princes from cadet branches to Chang'an. In 804 he restored Manichaeism as the state religion, after a visit to Manichean temple in Qocho. According to Colin Mackerras and Takao Moriyasu, he did not have any relations with China until 805 and this led Chinese historians to believe that Qutluq Bilge had died in 805. As such the Chinese court was surprised when they saw Manicheans among the embassy in 806. Qutluq II requested the Manichean temples to be reopened in China.

His reign saw territorial expansion of the khaganate, subjugation of Yenisei Kyrgyz, defeat of the Karluk Yabghu and Tibetan Empire in Tarim Basin, the conquest of Beshbaliq in 790, Karashar and Kucha in 798. (The new western border was the river Syr-Darya.) He also possibly aided Rafi ibn al-Layth against the Abbasids.

=== Death ===
He died sometime after March 808 and was succeeded by Baoyi Qaghan.
