= Bögü Qaghan =

Uyghur Khan

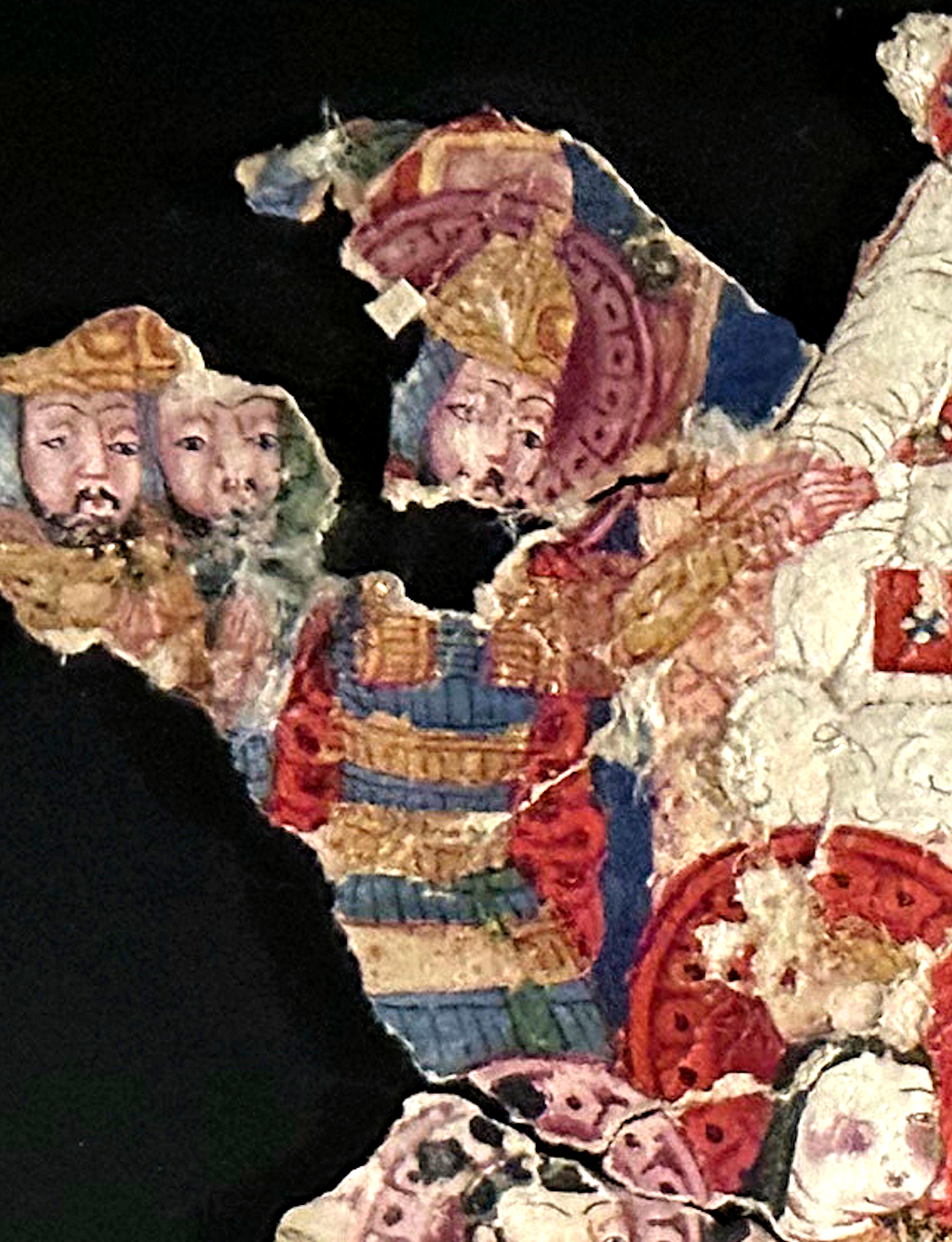
- Conversion of Bögü Qaghan to Manicheism in 762: detail of Bögü Qaghan in a suit of armour, kneeling to a Manichean high priest. 8th century Manichean manuscript (MIK 4979).

Qaghan of the Uyghurs
- Reign: 759–780
- Predecessor: Bayanchur Khan
- Successor: Tun Baga Tarkhan
- Born: Yàoluógé Yídijiàn (藥羅葛移地健)
- Died: 780
- Spouse: Quangin Khatun (光亲可敦); Princess Conghui (崇徽公主)
Regnal name
- Tengrida Qut Bolmish El Tutmish Alp Külüg Bilge Qaghan (𐱅𐰭𐰼𐰃𐰓𐰀:𐰸𐰆𐱃:𐰉𐰆𐰞𐰢𐱁:𐰃𐰠:𐱃𐰆𐱃𐰢𐱁:𐰞𐰯:𐰚𐰇𐰠𐰏:𐰋𐰃𐰠𐰏𐰀:𐰴𐰍𐰣); Heaven blessed, Sovereign, Brave, Glorious Wise Qaghan
Posthumous name
- Kün Tengrida Qut Bolmish El Tutmish Alp Külüg Bilge Qaghan (𐰚𐰇𐰤:𐱅𐰭𐰼𐰃𐰓𐰀:𐰸𐰆𐱃:𐰉𐰆𐰞𐰢𐱁:𐰠:𐱃𐰆𐱃𐰢𐱁:𐰞𐰯:𐰚𐰇𐰠𐰏:𐰋𐰃𐰠𐰏𐰀:𐰴𐰍𐰣); Blessed by Sun God, Sovereign, Brave, Glorious Wise Qaghan
- House: Yaglakar clan
- Father: Bayanchur Khan
- Mother: El Bilge Khatun
- Religion: Tengriism (before 763); Manichaeism (after 763)

Bögü Qaghan (Chinese: 牟羽可汗; pinyin: Móuyǔ Kèhán) or Tengri Qaghan (Chinese: 登里可汗; pinyin: Dēnglǐ Kèhán, died 780) was the third qaghan of the Uyghurs. He was the younger son of Bayanchur Qaghan. His personal name was Yaoluoge Yidijian (藥羅葛移地健) and was titled Ulu Bilge Töles Shad (Old Turkic: 𐰆𐰞𐰆:𐰋𐰃𐰠𐰏𐰀:𐱅𐰇𐰠𐰾:𐱁𐰑, lit. 'Great East Wise Prince') during his father's reign. His subsequent regnal names upon inheriting the throne were Tarkhan Bögü Qaghan, Alp Külüg Bögü Qaghan, and finally Tengrida Qut Bolmish El Tutmish Alp Külüg Bilge Qaghan (Old Turkic: 𐱅𐰭𐰼𐰃𐰓𐰀:𐰸𐰆𐱃:𐰉𐰆𐰞𐰢𐱁:𐰃𐰠:𐱃𐰆𐱃𐰢𐱁:𐰞𐰯:𐰚𐰇𐰠𐰏:𐰋𐰃𐰠𐰏𐰀:𐰴𐰍𐰣, lit. 'Heaven blessed, Sovereign, Brave, Glorious Wise Qaghan'). He was posthumously named Kün Tengrida Qut Bolmish El Tutmish Alp Külüg Bilge Qaghan by Baoyi Qaghan, stressing his adoption of the Manichean religion. Other titles granted to him were Yingyi Qaghan (英義可汗), a Tang dynasty invested title and Zahag-i Mani (Emanation of Mani), a Manichaean title.

He is known for being the most powerful monarch of the Uyghur Khaganate, converting to Manichaeism in 763, and founding the Por-Bazhyn Palace.

== Reign ==
Bögü Qaghan was viceroy of eastern part of the Uyghur Khaganate during his father Bayanchur's reign. Bögü succeeded him in 759. He was approached by Shi Chaoyi, who asked him to march on Tang with him. This proposal alarmed the Qaghan who rode 100,000 Uyghur soldiers to the Tang border, believing the dynasty had fallen. However, Emperor Daizong sent an embassy in 762, reminding him of his friendship with Bögü's late father, asking for an alliance. Li Kuo, supreme commander of Tang forces met with Bögü on 12 November 762 in his camp near Hebei and agreed to attack the remaining rebel forces. However, a number of his staff members had been arrested and killed over a dispute in the meeting protocol between the young prince and Bögü. This started a hatred in Li Kuo against Uyghurs for the rest of his life. In any case, Shi Chaoyi was crushed by the combined forces of Bögü and his father-in-law Pugu Huai'en near Luoyang and fled. Bögü returned to the steppe on 8 April 763 via Taiyuan. This successful war greatly improved Uyghur influence, all Uyghur officials together received a total tax income of 20,000 households, there were even reports about Uyghur soldiers arbitrarily capturing civilians in Chang'an markets to sell them as slaves in the middle of the day. Even when they were arrested, Daizong set them free.

Bögü allowed a contingent of Uyghurs to join forces with Tang China against the invading Tibetan forces from 765 to 768. Some of these commanders included his younger brother and ministers Motu Baga Tarkan, Tun Baga Tarkhan, Kutlug Bilge, Jiela Boyla Tarkhan, Prince Ulu Tarkhan, and Haiying Kül Tarkhan.

The remaining Uyghur generals An Ke (安恪) and Shi Diting (石帝庭) gathered groups of bandits and pillaged the region. Despite the treaty, the Uyghurs kept raiding Chinese territories. They invaded Taiyuan on 22 February 778, injuring and killing almost 10,000 Tang soldiers.

== Religious policy ==
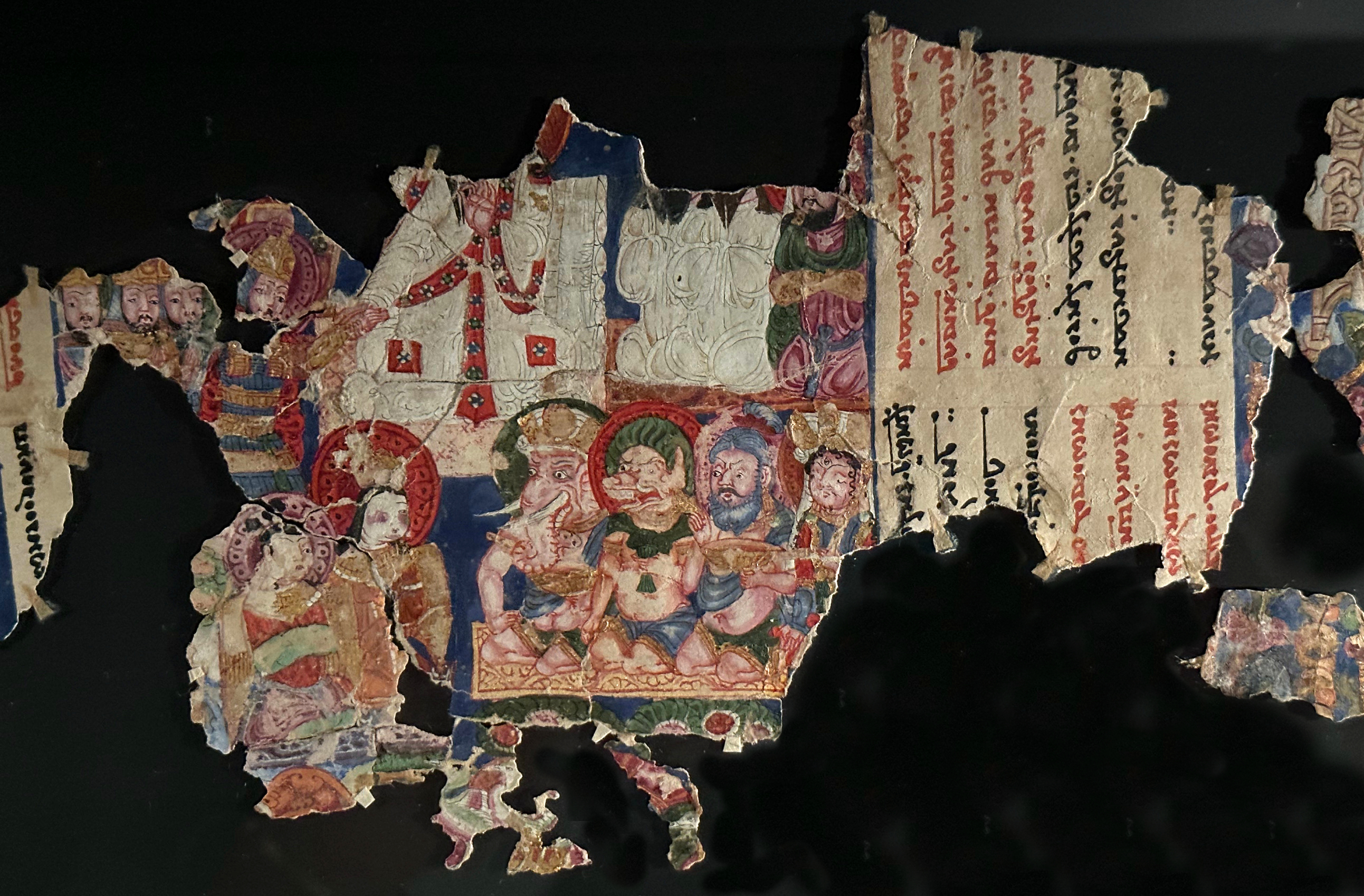
Conversion of Bögü Qaghan (759-780 CE) to Manicheism in 762 CE. 8th century Manichean manuscript (MIK 4979).

Bögü met four Manichaean priests, including Ruixi (睿息) in Luoyang and was interested in their religion. He took them to Ordu-Baliq and converted to Manichaeism and declared it a state religion in 763. Using his influence, he posed as the protector of the Manicheans and in 768 asked Daizong to re-open Manichaean temples in the empire. The Emperor did not sympathize with the Manichaeans, but was forced to give permission in 771. His Manichean followers urged him to invade Tang China, following Daizong's death in 779. This prompted a coup d'état inside the court led by Chief Minister Tun Baga Tarkhan, who was a zealous Tengriist and did not want any new war with the Tang. Bögü was murdered along with 2,000 to 3,000 of his supporters and relatives in 780.

== Family ==
Bögü qaghan was married to Pugu Huaien's daughter Quangin Khatun (光亲可敦). She died in 768. Emperor Daizong made another daughter of Pugu Huai'en, Princess Conghui (崇徽公主) on 2 June 769 and sent her as continuing the heqin treaty. She was given 20,000 pieces of silk as dowry.

== Legacy ==
According to Larry Clark, as the first ruler in history to adopt Manichaeism as personal and state religion, Bögü Qaghan was strongly revered by later Manichaean traditions.
