= Kutlug I Bilge Qaghan =

Kaghan of the Uyghur Khaganate (r. 744–747)

Qutlugh Bilge Kül

Khagan of the Uyghurs
- Reign: 744–747
- Successor: Bayanchur Khan
- Born: Yaoluoge Yibiaobi (藥羅葛逸标苾)
- Died: 747
- Issue: Tay Bilge Tutuq; Bayanchur Khan; Father of Chabush Tegin
Regnal name
- Qutlugh Bilge Kül Qaghan
- House: Yaglakar clan (藥羅葛)
- Father: Hushu (护输)
- Religion: Tengrism

Kutlug I Bilge Boyla Khagan, also known by his throne name Qutlugh Bilge Kül Qaghan (骨咄禄毗伽阙可汗, Gǔduōlù Píjiā Quē Kèhán), and in Chinese sources by the personal name of Yaoluoge Yibiaobi (藥羅葛逸标苾) was the khagan of the Uyghur Khaganate from 744 to 747.

== Service in Second Turkic Khaganate ==
His title was Külüg Boyla (Guli Peiluo - 骨力裴罗) during the Second Turkic Khaganate. He was a son of Yaoluoge Hushu (traditional - 藥羅葛護輸; simplified - 药罗葛护输). His father was the chieftain of Yaglakar clan and made numerous raids into Tang China. In 727 he ambushed Jiedushi Wang Junchuo (王君㚟), who had wrongly arrested his father Yaglakar Chengzong for treason and had previously deported Chengzong to Guangxi earlier, killing Wang and wounding Niu Xianke. He succeeded his father at some point after 727.

After Bilge Qaghan of the Second Turkic Khaganate died, a factional struggle arose within the ruling Ashina clan. An alliance of Basmyls, Uyghurs and Karluks overthrew the Second Turkic Khaganate and in the spring of 745 and killed Özmiş Khagan. At first, the Basmyl chief was elected a Kaghan titled Eletmish Kaghan (742–744), but he was soon overthrown by the allies, who elected Kutlug Boyla as Kutlug Bilge Kaghan.

== Reign ==
After coming to power in 744, Kutlug Bilge Khagan moved his court to Ordu-Baliq in the Orkhon valley. Kutlug Bilge Kaghan maintained an alliance with Tang China. He was made Prince of Fengyi (奉义王) and Huairen Khagan (怀仁可汗).

In 745 the Uyghurs defeated the last Turkic Khagan Baimei Khagan (744–745), and Kutlug Bilge Kaghan ordered his head to be sent to Chang'an, after which the Tang Emperor thanked him by entitling him "Supernumerary General-in-chief of Left Courageous Guard" (左骁卫员外大将军). For the next two years, the Uyghur power continuously expanded, although its control did not reach the size of the Turkic Khaganate.

He died in 747 and left his son Tay Bilge Tutuq as heir to throne, however his other son Bayanchur Khan killed him and usurped the throne. He had another son whose name is not recorded by sources. However through this son, he had at least one grandson named Chabish Tegin. Chabish had two sons; Qari Cor Tegin and Tun Bagha Tarkhan, the latter succeeding his cousin Bögü Tengri Qaghan.

== Reorganized tribes ==
At first he proclaimed himself as Tokuz Oghuz khagan (Chinese: 九姓可汗; lit. 'Khagan of Nine Tribes'). Nine tribes included Toquz Oghuz (nine Oghuz tribes), which were the Khaganal clan/sub-tribe Yaglakar (simplified Chinese: 药罗葛; traditional Chinese: 藥羅葛; pinyin: Yàoluógé) and eight Uyghur clans/sub-tribes known in Chinese rendering:

1. Huduoge 胡咄葛
2. Guluowu 啒罗勿
3. Mogexiqi 貊歌息讫
4. A-Wudi 阿勿嘀
5. Gesa 葛萨
6. Huwasu 斛嗢素
7. Yaowuge 藥勿葛
8. Xiyawu 奚牙勿

According to Edwin Pulleybank six Tiele tribes in the confederation – Bugu (僕固), Hun (渾), Bayegu (拔野古), Tongluo (同羅), Sijie (思結) and Qibi (契苾) – had an equal status with the Uyghurs (迴紇); the reduced Basmyls numbered eight sub-tribes, and the Karluks had three sub-tribes, thus the collective appellation Üç-Karluk (Three Karluks). Later the Abusi (阿布思) and Gulunwugu(si) (骨崙屋骨[思]) were also added (Tang Huiyao manuscript has 骨崙屋骨恐 Guluwugukong, yet Ulrich Theobald (2012) amends 恐 (kong) to 思 (si) & proposes that 屋骨思 transcribed Oğuz). Basmyls and Karluks were defeated by the Jiu Xing and forcibly incorporated, had a lower status, and were staged as vanguard of the Uyghur army, thus bringing the total number of tribes to eleven.

According to Haneda (1957), Toquz Oğuz were the Yaglakar-led group of nine clans included in the Uyghur tribe. In contrast, Golden (1992) proposed that Toquz Oğuz consisted of a Uygur-led group comprising nine tribes: Bugu, Hun, Bayegu, Tongluo, Sijie, Qibi, A-Busi, Gulunwugusi and the Uyghur proper, which comprised the nine clans of Yaglakar, Huduoge, Guluowu, Mogexiqi, AWudi, Gesa, Huwasu, Yaowuge, and Xiyawu. The Shine Usu inscription mentioned that the Yaqlakar ruled over the On-Uyğur (Ten[-Tribes] Uyghur) and Toquz Oghuz (Nine[-Tribe] Oghuz). Meanwhile, noticing that Tang Huiyao called the nine groups, led by Yaglakar, "surname-tribes" (姓部 xìngbù) while the Old Book of Tang and New Book of Tang called the other nine groups, led by Uyghurs, "tribes" (部落 bùluò), Japanese scholars Hashimoto, Katayama, and Senga propose that the Tang Huiyao's list contained the names of the Toquz Oghuz tribes proper, while each name in the two lists in the Books of Tang recorded each surname of each of nine subtribal chiefs.

Kutlug I Bilge Qaghan House of Yaglakar (745–840)
Regnal titles
Preceded by Kulun Beg; Ashina Shi	Kaghan of Uyghur Khaganate; 744–747	Succeeded by El-etmish Bilge Kaghan
Preceded by Hushu (护输)	Chief of Uyghurs	
