= Kut (mythology) =

Type of force vitalizing the body

According to the Turkic belief, kut (also spelled qut, Old Turkic: 𐰴𐰆𐱃, lit. 'blessing' or 'fortune') is a kind of force vitalizing the body. Through kut, humans are connected with the heavens. Further, the sacred ruler is believed to be endowed with much more kut than other people, thus the heaven would have appointed him as the legitimate ruler.

== Usage by the Turks ==
The Turkic khagans claimed that they were "heaven-like, heaven-conceived" and possessed kut, a sign of the Mandate of Heaven to rule.

Rulers of the Qocho were entitled idiqut "sacred good fortune" in Old Uyghur. It also existed in Mongols as suu. It was believed that if the ruler had lost his qut, he could be dethroned and killed. However, this had to be carried out without shedding his blood. This was usually done by strangling with a silk cord. This custom of strangling continued among the Ottomans.

The Ottomans also continued this tradition by reexpressing the "ruler's heavenly mandate" (kut) into Irano-Islamic terms with titles such as "Shadow of God on Earth" (zill Allah fi'l-alem) and "caliph of the face of the earth" (halife-i ru-yi zemin).

== Name ==
Kutlug is frequently used and well-known personal Uyghur name. It was also the name of first rulers of the Second Turkic Khaganate, Ilterish Qaghan, and the Uyghur Khaganate, Kutlug I Bilge Khagan.

== See also ==
- Kutadgu Bilig
- Mandate of Heaven
