= Orkhon Valley =

Valley in central Mongolia

Orkhon Valley Cultural Landscape
UNESCO World Heritage Site
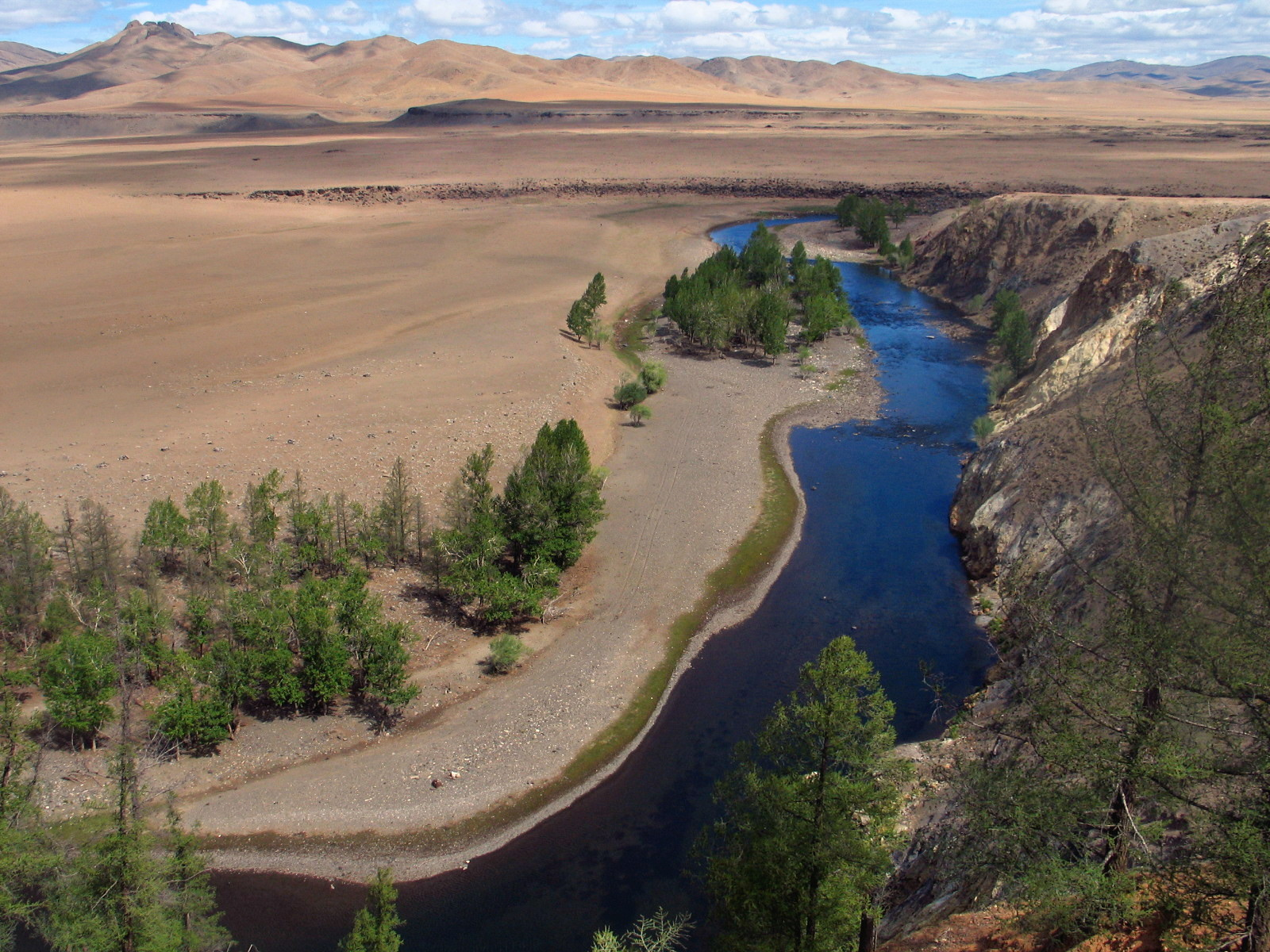

- Location within Mongolia
- Location: Mongolia
- Includes: Kharkhorum; Moiltyn Am; Orkhon-7; Khar Balgas; Erdene Zuu Monastery; Tuvkhun Hermitage; Shankh Western Monastery; Doit Hill palace; Orkhon inscriptions
- Criteria: Cultural: (ii), (iii), (iv)
- Reference: 1081rev
- Inscription: 2004 (28th Session)
- Area: 121,967 ha (301,390 acres)
- Buffer zone: 61,044 ha (150,840 acres)
- Coordinates: 47°33′24″N 102°49′53″E

The Orkhon Valley Cultural Landscape (Note: /ˈɔːrkɒn/ OR-kon; Mongolian: Орхоны хөндийн соёлын дурсгал, romanized: Orkhonii khöndiin soyoliin dursgal, IPA: [ɔrχɜní xɵntíɴ sɔi̯ˑɮíɴ tʊ́rsχəɬ]; Classical Mongolian: ᠣᠷᠬᠣᠨ ᠤ ᠬᠥᠨᠳᠡᠢ ᠶᠢᠨ ᠰᠤᠶᠤᠯ ᠤᠨ ᠳᠤᠷᠠᠰᠬᠠᠯ) sprawls along the banks of the Orkhon River in Central Mongolia, some 320 km west from the capital Ulaanbaatar. It was inscribed by UNESCO in the World Heritage List as representing the development of nomadic pastoral traditions spanning more than two millennia.

== Significance ==
For many centuries, the Orkhon Valley was viewed as the seat of the imperial power of the steppes. The first evidence comes from a stone stele with Orkhon inscriptions, which was erected in the valley by Bilge Khan, an 8th-century ruler of the Göktürk Empire. Some 25 miles to the north of the stele, in the shadow of the sacred forest-mountain Ötüken, was his Ördü, or nomadic capital. During the Khitan domination of the valley, the stele was reinscribed in three languages, so as to record the deeds of a Qidan potentate.

Mountains were considered sacred in Tengriism as an axis mundi, but Ötüken was especially sacred because the ancestor spirits of the khagans and beys resided here. Moreover, a force called kut was believed to emanate from this mountain, granting the khagan the divine right to rule the Turkic tribes. Whoever controlled this valley was considered heavenly appointed leader of the Turks and could rally the tribes. Thus control of the Orkhon Valley was of the utmost strategic importance for every Turkic state. Historically every Turkic capital (Ördü) was located here for this exact reason.

== Sites ==
Ulaan Tsutgalan waterfall

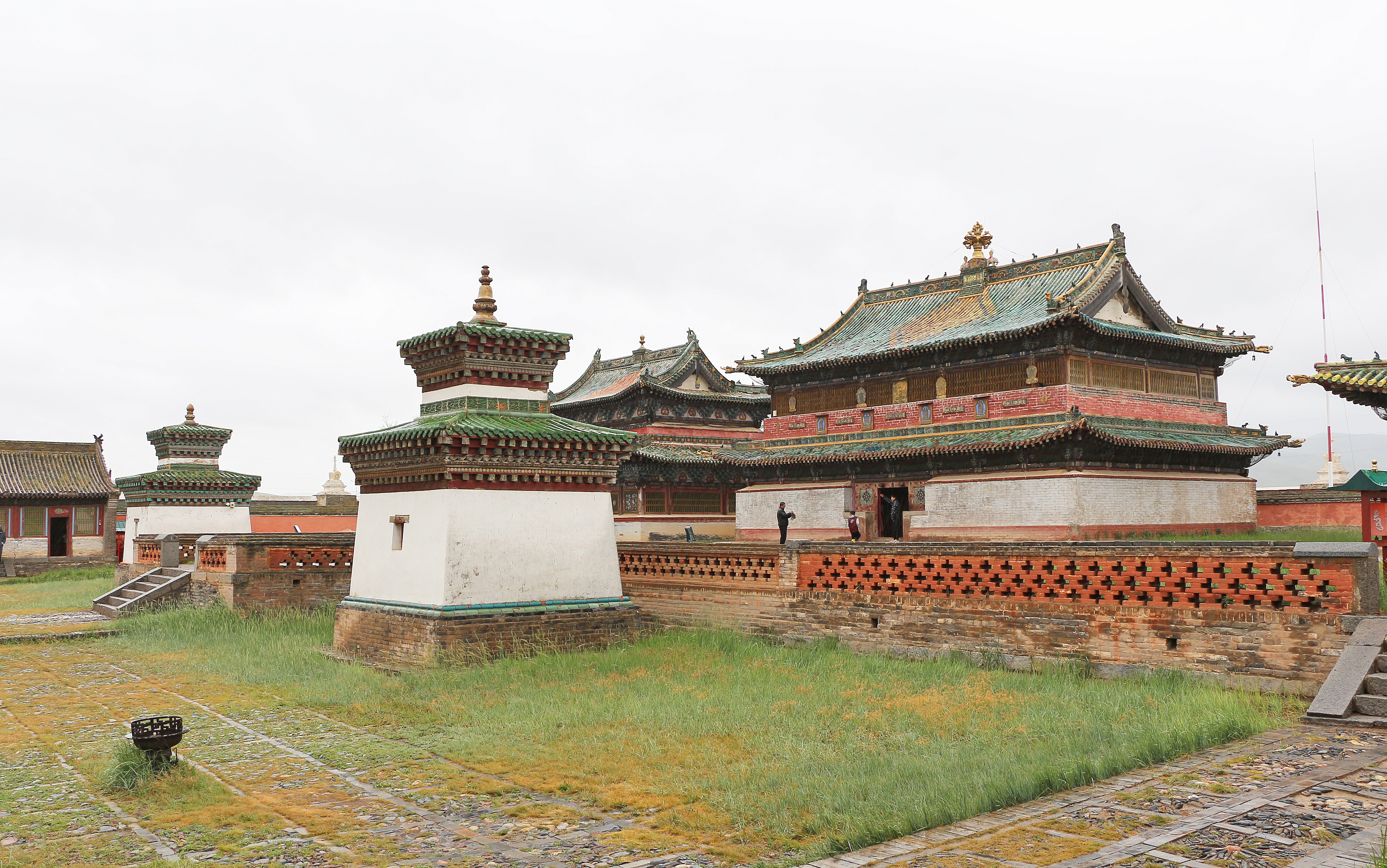
Erdene Zuu monastery

The main monuments of the Orkhon Valley are as follows:

- The Orkhon monuments are early 8th-century Turkic memorials to Bilge Khan and Kul Tigin, the most impressive monuments from the nomadic First Turkic Khaganate. They were discovered by Russian archaeologists in 1889 and deciphered by Vilhelm Thomsen in 1893.
- Ruins of Ordu-Baliq at the site known as Kharbalgas in Mongolian, an 8th-century capital of the Uyghur Khaganate, which cover 50 square km and contain evidence of the palace, shops, temples, monasteries, etc.
- Ruins of Mongol capital of Karakorum.
- Erdene Zuu monastery is the first Buddhist monastery established in Mongolia. It was partly destroyed by Soviet authorities in 1937-40.
- Tuvkhun Hermitage is another spectacular monastery, overlooking a hill at 2,600 meters above sea level. It was almost totally destroyed by the Soviet Union.
- Remains of the 13th and 14th century Mongol palace at Doit Hill, thought to be Ögedei Khan's residence.
- The Ulaan Tsutgalan waterfall, ten meters wide and twenty meters high, that can sometimes go dry or even freeze during winter.
