= Külüg Qaghan =

Külüg Bilge Qaghan

Qaghan of the Uyghurs
- Reign: 790
- Predecessor: Tun Baga Tarkhan
- Successor: Qutluq Bilge Qaghan
- Born: Yàoluógé Duōluósī (藥羅葛多邏斯)
- Died: 790
- Spouse: E (葉)
Regnal name
- Ay Tengride Bolmish Külüg Bilge Qaghan (𐰖:𐱅𐰭𐰼𐰃𐰓𐰀:𐰉𐰆𐰞𐰢𐰃𐱁:𐰚𐰇𐰠𐰏:𐰋𐰃𐰠𐰏𐰀:𐰴𐰍𐰣); Moon Godborn Glorious Wise Qaghan
- House: Yaglakar clan
- Father: Tun Baga Tarkhan
- Religion: Tengriism

Külüg Bilge Qaghan was the 5th leader of Uyghur Khaganate. His Tang invested title was Zhongzhen Qaghan (忠貞可汗) and was known as Panguan Tegin (泮官特勒) before taking the throne. He was born around 772/773.

== Biography ==
=== Reign ===
He was a minor when his father, Tun Baga Tarkhan of the Uyghur Khaganate, died. He was known as Panguan Tegin (泮官特勒), when raised to throne after his father's death. He reigned for only 5 months.

=== Death ===
According to one account he was killed by his brother, who for a time usurped the throne. Another account suggested that Külüg Qaghan was poisoned by a khatun – E (葉), who happened to be a granddaughter of Pugu Huai'en. His throne was usurped by his brother, however he was killed by nobles who in turn raised his minor son Achuo (阿啜) to the throne.

His death happened just before Uyghurs suffered a heavy defeat under Grand Chancellor Inanchu Bilge (頡千逝斯) of Elter (𨁂跌) against the Tibetans who were aided by the ruler of the Karluk Yabghu, Alp Burguchan who united the Chigils, Bulaqs and Shatuo, near Beshbaliq. As a result Yang Xigu (楊襲古) Commander of Beiting Protectorate committed suicide.
