= Qutluq Bilge Qaghan =

Sixth khagan of the Uyghur Khaganate

Qaghan of the Uyghurs
- Reign: 790–795
- Predecessor: Külüg Qaghan
- Successor: Qutluq II
- Born: Yàoluógé Āchuài (藥羅葛阿啜); 776 or 777
- Died: 795
Regnal name
- Qutluq Bilge Qaghan (𐰸𐰆𐱃𐰞𐰸:𐰋𐰃𐰠𐰏𐰀:𐰴𐰍𐰣); Blessed Wise Qaghan
- House: Yaglakar clan
- Father: Külüg Qaghan
- Religion: Tengriism

Qutluq Bilge Qaghan (died 795) was the sixth khagan of the Uyghur Khaganate and the last one from the Yaglakar clan. His Tang invested title was Fengcheng Qaghan (Chinese: 奉誠可汗; lit. 'Sincerity showing Qaghan').

== Life ==
According to the Zizhi Tongjian Qutluq Bilge Qaghan was born in 776, while the Cefu Yuangui, New Book of Tang and Old Book of Tang suggest he was born in 774–775. According to Colin Mackerras, these numbers merely meant he was a minor. He was put under regency of Grand Chancellor Inanchu Bilge (頡千逝斯) of the Xiedie (𨁂跌) clan.

== Reign ==
During his reign, the Uyghurs formed an alliance with Tang China against the Tibetans and Karluks who were struggling for supremacy in the Tarim Basin. He died soon enough without an heir. He was followed by Grand Chancellor Inanchu Bilge in a kurultai. Even though the royal clan changed from the Yaglakar to the Ädiz clan, his successor adopted a Yaglakar surname because of the prestige.
