= Tun Baga Tarkhan =

Alp Qutlugh Bilge Qaghan
- Qaghan of the Uyghur Khaganate

Qaghan of the Uyghurs
- Reign: 780–789
- Predecessor: Bögü Qaghan
- Successor: Külüg Qaghan
- Born: Yàoluógé Dùnmòhè (藥羅葛顿莫賀) c. 737–742
- Died: December 789 (at age of 48~53)
- Spouse: Princess Xian'an (咸安公主)
Regnal name
- Alp Kutlugh Bilge Qaghan (𐰞𐰯:𐰸𐰆𐱃𐰞𐰍:𐰋𐰃𐰠𐰏𐰀:𐰴𐰍𐰣); Brave, Blessed, Wise Qaghan
Posthumous name
- Bögü Bilge Tengri Qaghan (𐰋𐰇𐰏𐰇:𐰋𐰃𐰠𐰏𐰀:𐱅𐰭𐰼𐰃:𐰴𐰍𐰣)
- House: Yaglakar clan ?
- Father: Chabush Tegin (车毗尸特勤)
- Religion: Tengrism

Tun Baga Tarkhan or Alp Qutlugh Bilge Qaghan was the fourth leader of the Uyghur Khaganate.

== Background ==
There is an uncertainty regarding Tun Baga Tarkhan's relation to the ruling Yaglakar clan. His father's name is absent from Chinese documents. Luo Xin, a historian at Peking University, proposed that the Uyghur prince Gechuai (Old Turkic: 𐰴𐰺𐰃:𐰲𐰆𐰺:𐱅𐰃𐰏𐰤, romanized: Qarı čor tegin, 葛啜王子) –who died of cold fever on 11 June 795 and whose epitaph was found in 2010 in Xian– was in fact a younger brother of Yaoluoge Dunmohe. The epitaph stated that Gechuai's father's name was Chabish Tegin (Old Turkic: 𐰲𐰉𐱂 𐱅𐰃𐰏𐰤, romanized: Çabïş Tigin, 车毗尸特勤), Luo Xin established him as the prince who fought against An Lushan in 757. So, according to him, Tun Baga Tarkhan was a nephew to Bögü Qaghan, as well as grandson of Bayanchur. Li Bi also considered him as cousin of Bögü Qaghan.

== Biography ==
=== Life ===
Tun Baga Tarkhan's exact birth date is unknown. He earlier participated in the Uyghur army against An Lushan under the military title Alp Tutuq in 757. He was a chief minister in the Uyghur court and perhaps one of supporters of Pugu Huai'en's revolt in 764–765. However he later switched to the Tang side after Pugu's death. His uncle Khan Tudun was also a minister. He was a fervent anti-Manichaean, therefore he found Bögü Qaghan's adoption of Manichaeism unfavorable. Bögü's new plan of invading Tang China due to pressure from Manichaean clergy caused him to establish his own anti-war faction. He appealed to Bögü, saying:

The Tang is a great state and it never betrayed us. Last year we invaded Taiyuan and seized several tens of thousands of sheep and horses. We could count that a great victory. But because our way back was difficult and obstructed, by the time we reached our home, we were suffering from wounds, were tired and almost exhausted. If we mobilise our forces again and do not gain a victory, how will we return at all?

Unable to accomplish his task, he murdered Bögü and his followers among him in 779/780 and went on to declare himself qaghan.

=== Reign ===
He was invested with Chinese title Wuyi Chenggon Qaghan (Chinese: 武義成功可汗; lit. 'Warlike', 'righteous and merited qaghan') from Emperor Dezong on 28 July 780. His first order was to repeal the protection of Manicheans and Sogdians living in China. This also rendered Uyghurs in China defenceless. His uncle Tudun was thus murdered on 7 September 780. His body was brought back to the Uyghur capital in 782 when the embassy was greeted by Tun Baga's new chancellor (İl Ögesi in Old Uyghur) Inanchu Bilge (頡千逝斯) of the Xiedie (𨁂跌) clan, who would later rise to be an important member of khaganate. Tun Baga demanded blood money from Dezong to not start a war later.

==== Marriage to Princess Xian'an ====
As an effort to obtain an alliance, Tun Baga sent an emissary to Tang China for a marriage proposal on 2 October 787. Emperor Dezong had hated the Uyghurs, ever since several of his attendants were tortured and killed by Bögü Qaghan in 762 and therefore refused. Only after repeated attempts by Li Bi that that grudge should not be borne against the current qaghan as well as repeated analyses of how crucial the Uyghur alliance would be did Emperor Dezong agree – particularly after Li Bi, who was friends with both Tun Baga and the Inanchu Bilge extracted promises from Tun Baga to submit to the Tang as a subject as a matter of formality. Emperor Dezong was pleased, and subsequently, the treaty was cemented with the betrothal of Emperor Dezong's daughter Princess Xian'an to Tun Baga. The marriage ceremony was well documented in the New Book of Tang. The delegation of men consisted of 1,000 people and was headed by Inanchu Bilge, the women delegation was led by Kutluk Bilge Konchuy, Tun Baga's younger sister. Tun Baga also asked Dezong to change the Chinese name for Uyghurs, Huihu (回鶻) to Huihe (回紇). He also received a new Chinese title Changshou Tianqin Qaghan (Chinese: 長壽天親可汗; lit. 'Long living', 'Heaven blessed Qaghan') along with the princess who was made Zhihuiduan Zhengshou Xiaoshun Khatun (Chinese: 智慧断征收孝顺可敦; lit. 'Wise', 'graceful', 'upright', 'long-lived', 'filial and obedient khatun') on 30 November 788.

==== Death ====
He died in December 789 and succeeded by his son. According to Luo Xin, he was posthumously named Bögü Bilge Tengri Qaghan (Old Turkic: 𐰋𐰇𐰏𐰇:𐰋𐰃𐰠𐰏𐰀:𐱅𐰭𐰼𐰃:𐰴𐰍𐰣).

== Family ==
He was married to Princess Xian'an, daughter of Emperor Dezong of Tang on 30 November 788. He had at least two sons from other wives:

1. Külüg Qaghan - ruled the Uyghur Khaganate in 790
2. Another son

He also had at least two younger brothers:

- Prince Gechuai (or Qari Chor) - born in 776, died in 795 in Chang'an.
- Apa Chor (was alive in 795)
