= Yaglakar clan =

Turkic royal clan

Yaglakar Old Turkic: 𐰖𐰍𐰞𐰴𐰺, romanized: Yaɣlaqar Chinese: 藥羅葛; pinyin: Yàoluógé
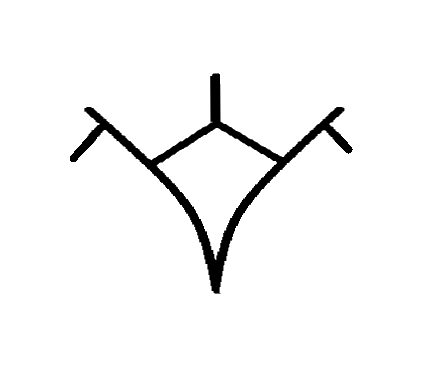
- Tamga of Yaglakar
- Country: Uyghur Khaganate, Ganzhou Uyghur Kingdom
- Founder: Bezgek Yaglakar Khan (mythical)
- Connected families: Ädiz clan
- Dissolution: 795 (main line)

The Yaglakar clan was the first imperial clan of the Uyghur Khaganate. Descendants of the Yaglakar clan would later establish the Ganzhou Uyghur Kingdom.

== Origin ==
The clan was named after a mythical founder Yaglakar Khan or Buk Khan (卜可汗). Initially a part of the Tiele Confederation, they later carried the hereditary title elteber as subjects of the Tang dynasty. The first known member of the clan was Tegin Irkin (特健俟斤 *dək̚-ɡɨɐn^{H} ʒɨ^{X}-kɨn > Tèjiàn Sìjīn).

== Chiefs of the clan ==
Name	Chinese name	Reign	Notes
Tegin Irkin	特健俟斤/時健俟斤		Lady Wuluohun (烏羅渾)
Yaoluoge Pusa	藥羅葛菩薩	?–629	He was allied to the Xueyantuo to fight the Eastern Turkic Khaganate Defeated Yukuk Shad
Yaoluoge Tumidu	藥羅葛吐迷度	647–648	Submitted to the Tang, was made Commander of the Hanhai Area Command
Yaoluoge Wuhe	藥羅葛烏紇	648	Murdered his uncle Tumidu, was a son-in-law of Chebi Khan
Yaoluoge Porun	藥羅葛婆閏	648–662	Made chief by Cui Dunli on the order of Emperor Taizong of Tang
Yaoluoge Bisidu	藥羅葛比粟毒	662–680	Rebelled against Emperor Gaozong of Tang, executed by Qibi Heli
Yaoluoge Dujiezhi	藥羅葛獨解支	680–695	Son of Bisidu
Yaoluoge Fudifu	藥羅葛伏帝匐	695–719	Son of Dujiezhi, was made Vice Military Commissioner of Hexi in 715
Yaoluoge Chengzong	藥羅葛承宗	719–727	Son of Fudifu, exiled to the Second Turkic Khaganate
Yaoluoge Fudinan	藥羅葛伏帝難	727	Commander of the Hanhai Area Command
Yaoluoge Hushu	藥羅葛護輸	727	Killed Jiedushi Wang Junchuo (王君㚟) and wounded Niu Xianke in 727
Yaoluoge Yibiaobi	藥羅葛逸标苾	727–744	Founded the Uyghur Khaganate

== Khagans ==
Personal Name	Turkic title	Chinese title	Reign
Yaoluoge Yibiaobi	Qutlugh Bilge Köl Qaghan	Huairen Khagan (怀仁可汗)	744–747
Yaoluoge Moyanchuo	Tengrida Bolmish El Etmish Bilge Qaghan	Yingwu Weiyuan Pijia Qaghan (英武威遠毗伽闕可汗)	747–759
Yaoluoge Yidijian	Tengrida Qut Bolmish El Tutmish Alp Külüg Bilge Qaghan	Yingyi Qaghan (英義可汗)	759–780
Yaoluoge Dunmohe	Alp Qutlugh Bilge Qaghan	Wuyi Chenggong Qaghan (武義成功可汗) Changshou Tianqin Qaghan (長壽天親可汗)	780–789
Yaoluoge Duoluosi	Kulug Bilge Qaghan	Zhongzhen Qaghan (忠貞可汗)	789–790
Yaoluoge Achuo	Qutluq Bilge Qaghan	Fengcheng Qaghan (奉誠可汗)	790–795

With the death of Yaoluoge Achuo in 795, the main line of the Yaglakar clan ceased to exist. However, successive khagans adopted the Yaglakar surname for prestige. The rest of the clan members were exiled to the Tang capital Chang'an. An epitaph was found in 2010 in Xi'an which belonged to one of the Yaglakar princes, Prince Gechuai (葛啜王子), younger brother of Yaoluoge Dunmohe who died of cold fever on 11 June 795 and was buried on 28 June 795.

Another line of the Yaglakar clan came to rule the Ganzhou Uyghur Kingdom in 890s.

== Ganzhou Uyghur kings ==
Personal Name	Turkic title	Chinese title	Reign
Yaoluoge Renmei		Yingyi Qaghan (英義可汗)	911–924
Yaoluoge Aduo/Diyin/Renyu		Shunhua Qaghan (順化可汗) Fenghua Qaghan (奉化可汗)	924–959
Yaoluoge Jingjiong			960–975
Yaoluoge Milie	Yaglakar Bilge Qaghan		976–983
Yaoluoge?		Zhongshun Baode Qaghan (忠順保德可汗)	1004–1016
Yaoluoge Guihua		Huaining Shunhua Qaghan (懷甯順化可汗)	1016–1023
Yaoluoge Tongshun		Guizhong Baoshun Qaghan (歸忠保順可汗)	1023–1028
Yaoluoge Yasu		Baoguo Qaghan (寶國可汗)	1028–1032

The last member of the clan, Baoguo Qaghan, committed suicide in 1032 after the Ganzhou Uyghur Kingdom was annexed by the Western Xia. Yuri Zuev proposed that the Yaglakar clan survived and eventually became Mongolized under the name "Jalairs". The descendants of the Yaglakars in Qinghai Yugurs often sinicize their surname as Yang.
