= Uyghur Khaganate =

744–840 Turkic empire in East Asia

Uyghur Khaganate 𐱃𐰆𐰴𐰕:𐰆𐰍𐰕:𐰉𐰆𐰑𐰣 Toquz Oɣuz Budun
- 744–840
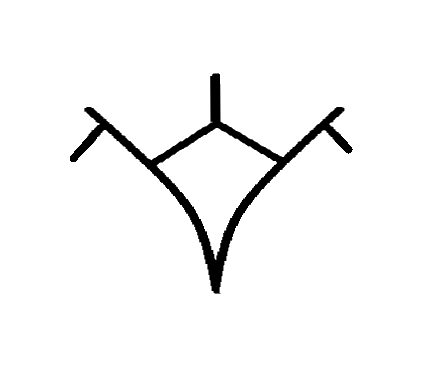
- Tamga of the Yaglakar clan

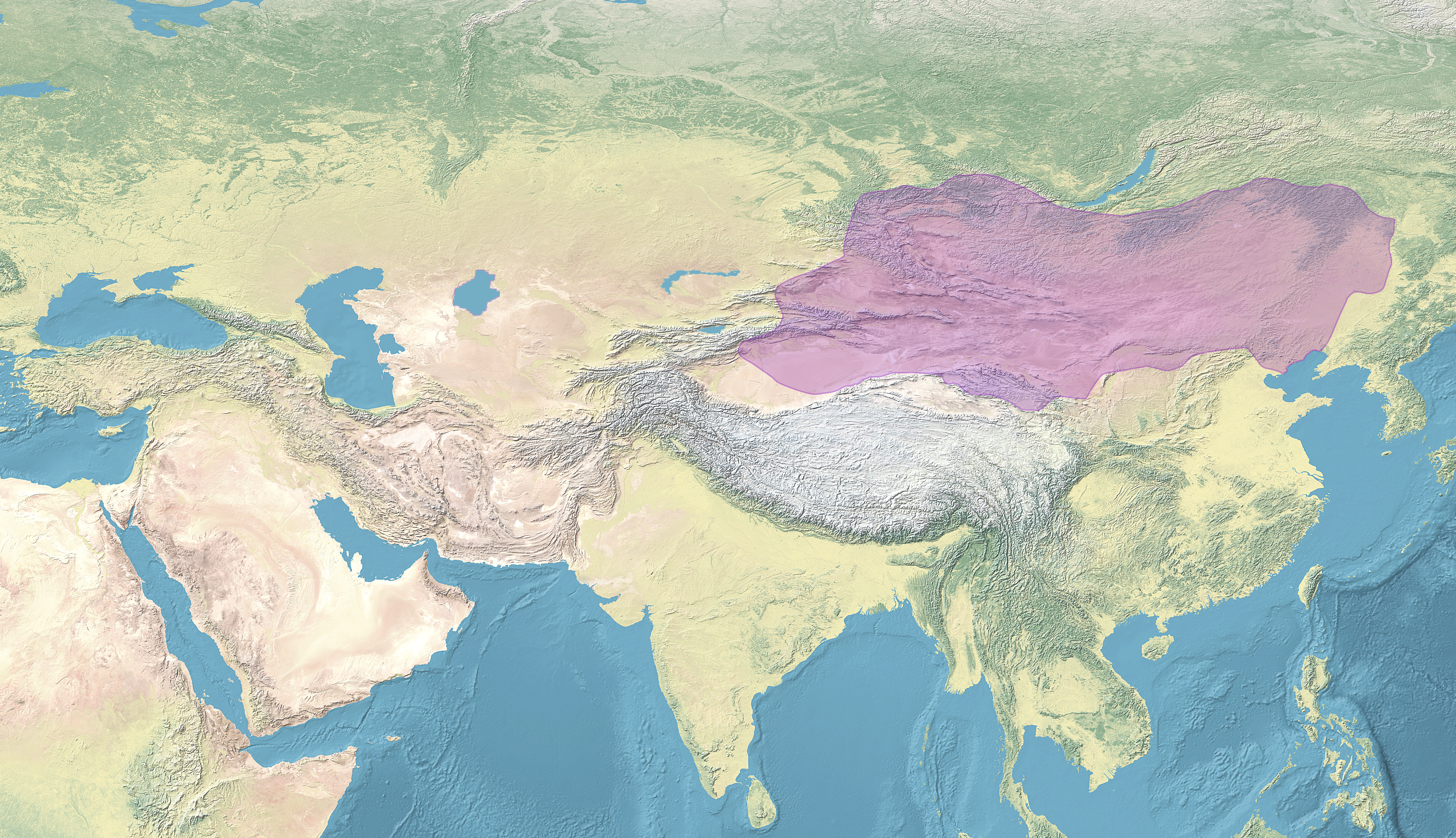
- Territory of the Uyghur Khaganate (745–850), and main contemporary polities in continental Asia
- Status: Nomadic empire
- Capital: Ötüken; Ordu-Baliq (later)
- Common languages: Old Uyghur; Middle Chinese
- Religion: Manichaeism (official); Tengrism; Buddhism; Nestorian Christianity
- Government: Monarchy
- Khagan
  - 744–747: Qutlugh Bilge Köl (first)
  - 841–847: Enian Qaghan (last)
- History
  - Established: 744
  - Disestablished: 840

Area
- 800: 3,100,000 km^{2} (1,200,000 sq mi)
Preceded by
Second Turkic Khaganate
Succeeded by
Kara-Khanid Khanate
Gansu Uyghur Kingdom
Kingdom of Qocho
Yenisei Kyrgyz Khaganate

Uyghur Khaganate
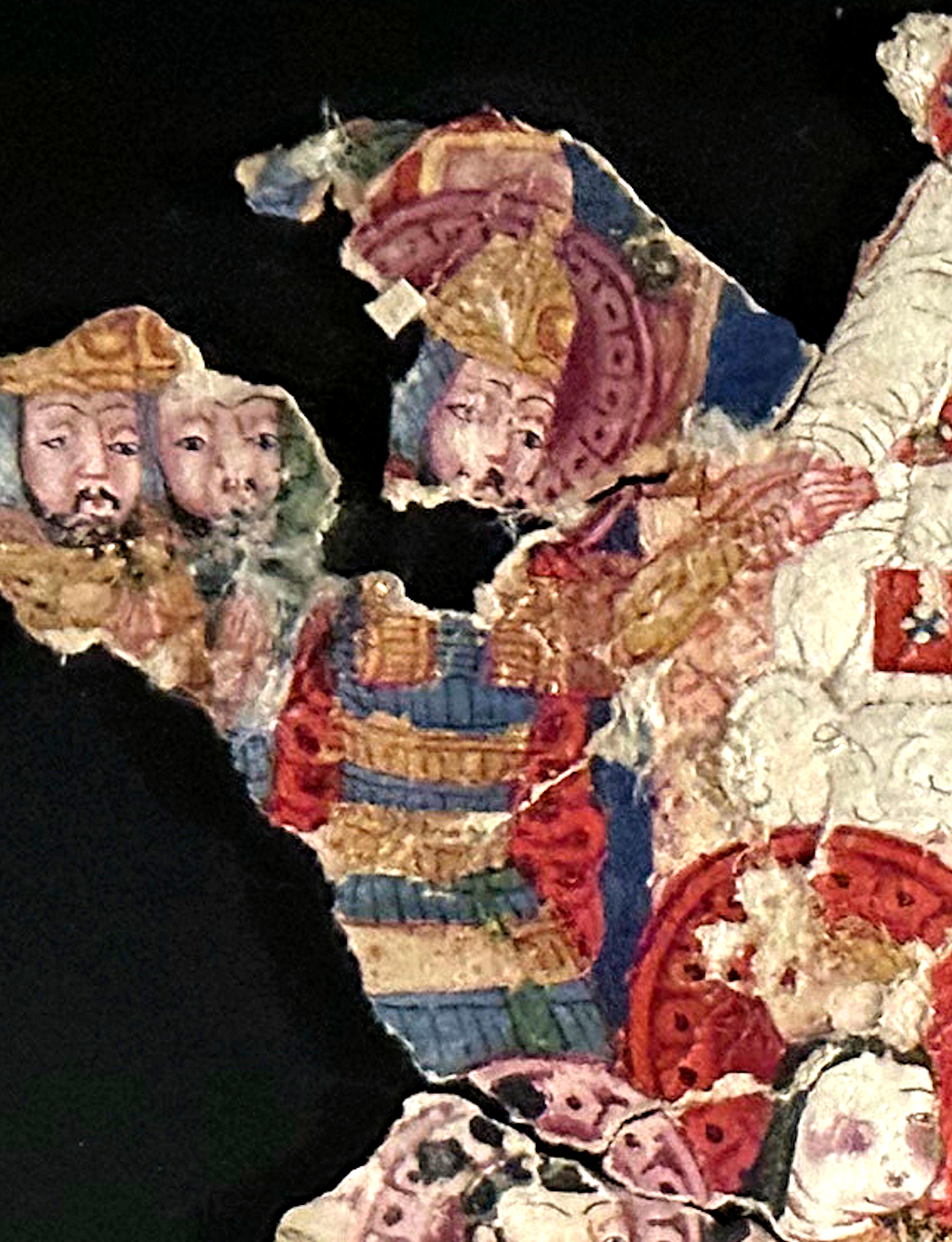
- Bögü Qaghan, third khagan of the Uyghurs, in a suit of armour, converting to Manicheism in 762.

Huihu
- Traditional Chinese: 回鶻
- Simplified Chinese: 回鹘
Transcriptions
Standard Mandarin
- Hanyu Pinyin: Huíhú
- Wade–Giles: Hui-hu

Huihe
- Traditional Chinese: 回紇
- Simplified Chinese: 回纥
Transcriptions
Standard Mandarin
- Hanyu Pinyin: Huíhé
- Wade–Giles: Hui-ho

The Nine Tribes
- Chinese: 九姓
- Literal meaning: Nine Surnames
Transcriptions
Standard Mandarin
- Hanyu Pinyin: Jiǔxìng
- Wade–Giles: Chiu-hsing

Old Turkic name
- Old Turkic: 𐱃𐰆𐰴𐰕:𐰆𐰍𐰕:𐰉𐰆𐰑𐰣; Toquz Oɣuz Budun "People of the Nine Tribes"

The Uyghur Khaganate, self defined as the Toquz Oghuz ("Nine Tribes") and known to the Tang Chinese as the Jiuxing was a Turkic empire that existed for about a century between the mid 8th and 9th centuries. It was a tribal confederation under the Uyghur nobility.

== History ==
=== Rise ===
In the mid-5th century, Uyghurs were a tribe of the Tiele, which was under the Turkic Khaganate.

In 657, the Western Turkic Khaganate was defeated by the Tang dynasty, after which the Uyghurs defected to the Tang. Prior to this the Uyghurs had already shown an inclination towards alliances with the Tang when they fought with them against the Tibetan Empire and Turks in 627.

In 742, the Uyghurs, Karluks, and Basmyls rebelled against the Second Turkic Khaganate.

In 744, the Basmyls captured the Turkic capital of Ötüken and killed the reigning Özmiş Khagan. Later that year, a Uyghur-Karluk alliance formed against the Basmyls and defeated them. Their khagan was killed, and the Basmyls ceased to exist as a people. Hostilities between the Uyghurs and Karluks then forced the Karluks to migrate west into Zhetysu and conflict with the Türgesh, whom they defeated and conquered in 766.

The Uyghur khagan was Kutlug I Bilge Khagan, who claimed to be the supreme ruler of all the tribes. He built his capital at Ordu-Baliq. According the New Book of Tang, the territory of the Uyghur Empire then reached "on its eastern extremity, the territory of Shiwei, on the west the Altai Mountains, on the south it controlled the Gobi Desert, so it covered the entire territory of the ancient Xiongnu".

In 745, the Uyghurs killed the last khagan of the Göktürks, Kulun Beg, and sent his head to the Tang.

=== Tribal composition ===
The Tang Huiyao, vol. 98, listed nine Toquz Oghuz surname tribes (姓部 xìngbù); another list of tribes (部落 bùluò) was recorded in the Old Book of Tang and the New Book of Tang. According to Japanese scholars Hashimoto, Katayama, and Senga, each name in the lists in the Books of Tang recorded each subtribal surname of each chief, while the other list in Tang Huiyao recorded the names of the Toquz Oghuz tribes proper. Walter Bruno Henning (1938) linked nine names recorded in the Saka language "Staël-Holstein Scroll" with those recorded by Han Chinese authors.

Tribal name in Chinese (Mandarin pinyin romanization)	Tribal name in Saka	Tribal name in Old Turkic	Surname in Old Turkic	Surname in Saka	Surname in Chinese (Mandarin romanization)
迴紇 (Huihe)		Uyğur 𐰺𐰍𐰖𐰆	𐰖𐰍𐰞𐰴𐰺 Yağlaqar	Yahīdakari	藥羅葛 (Yaoluoge)
僕固 (Pugu)	Bākū	*Buqu[t]	*(H)Uturqar		胡咄葛 (Huduoge)
渾 (Hun)		*Qun	*Kürebir	Kurabīri	咄羅勿 (Guluowu)
拔曳固 (Bayegu)	Bayarkāta	Bayırku	*Boqsıqıt	Bāsikātti	貊歌息訖 (Mogexiqi)
同羅 (Tongluo)	Ttaugara	Tongra	*Avučağ		阿勿嘀 (A-Wudi)
思結 (Sijie)	Sīkari	*Sıqar	*Qasar		葛薩 (Gesa)
契苾 (Qibi)	Kāribari				斛嗢素 (Huwasu)
阿布思 (A-Busi)			*Yabutqar	Yabūttikari	藥勿葛 (Yaowuge)
骨倫屋骨(思) (Gulunwugu(si)) (Note: Tang Huiyao manuscript has 骨崙屋骨恐; Ulrich Theobald (2012) amended 恐 (kong) to 思 (si) & proposed that 屋骨思 transcribed Oğuz)			*(Q)Ayabir	Ayabīri	奚耶勿 (Xiyawu)

=== Golden Age ===
They are frugal[...] and united with one another, so their power is invincible.

— Zizhi Tongjian

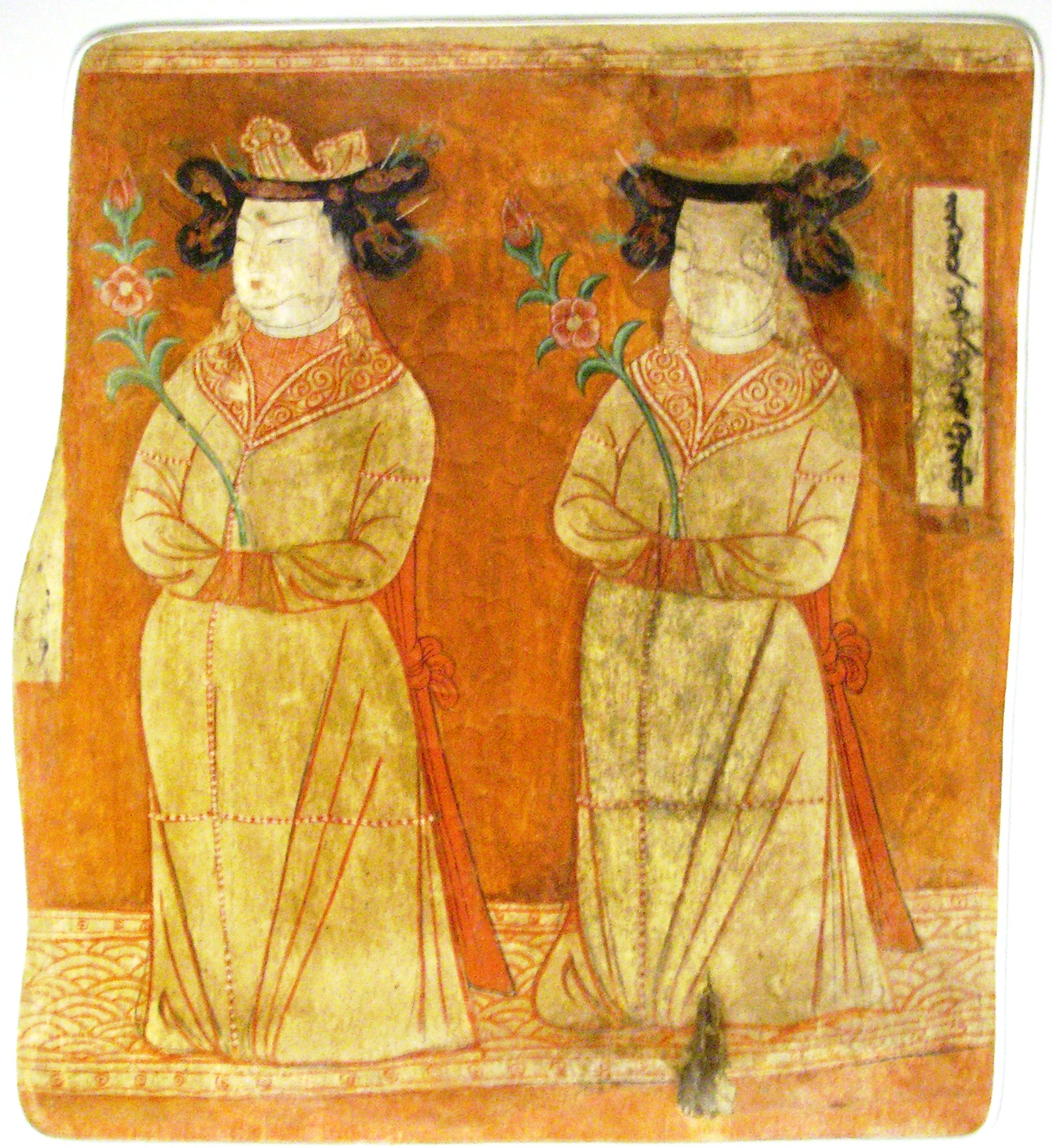
Uyghur princesses from the Bezeklik murals

In 747, Qutlugh Bilge Köl Kaghan died and was succeeded by his youngest son, Bayanchur Khan. After building a number of trading outposts with the Tang, Bayanchur used the profits to construct the capital, Ordu-Baliq, and another city further up the Selenga River, Bai Baliq. He then embarked on a series of campaigns to bring all the steppe peoples under his banner. During this time the empire expanded rapidly and brought the Sekiz Oghuz, Kyrgyz, Karluks, Türgesh, Toquz Tatars, Chiks and the remnants of the Basmyls under Uyghur rule.

In 751, the Tang Empire suffered a strategic defeat against the Arabs at the Battle of Talas. After that, the Tang retreated from Central Asia, allowing the Uyghurs to emerge as the new dominant power.

In 755 An Lushan instigated a rebellion against the Tang dynasty and in 756 Emperor Suzong of Tang turned to Bayanchur for assistance. Bayanchur agreed and ordered his eldest son to provide military service to Suzong. In 757 approximately 4,000 Uyghur horsemen assisted Tang armies in retaking Chang'an and Luoyang. After the battle at Luoyang the Uyghurs looted the city for three days and only stopped after large quantities of silk were extracted. For their aid, the Tang sent 20,000 rolls of silk and bestowed them with honorary titles. In addition the horse trade was fixed at 40 rolls of silk for every horse and Uyghurs were given "guest" status while staying in Tang China. The Tang and Uyghurs conducted an exchange marriage. Bayanchur married Princess Ninguo while a Uyghur princess was married to a Tang prince. The Uyghur Khaganate exchanged princesses in marriage with Tang dynasty China in 756 to seal the alliance against An Lushan. Bayanchur had his daughter Uyghur Princess Pijia (毗伽公主) married to the Tang prince Li Chengcai (李承采), Prince of Dunhuang (敦煌王李承采), son of Li Shouli, Prince of Bin. while the Tang princess Ningguo (寧國公主), daughter of Suzong, married Bayanchur.

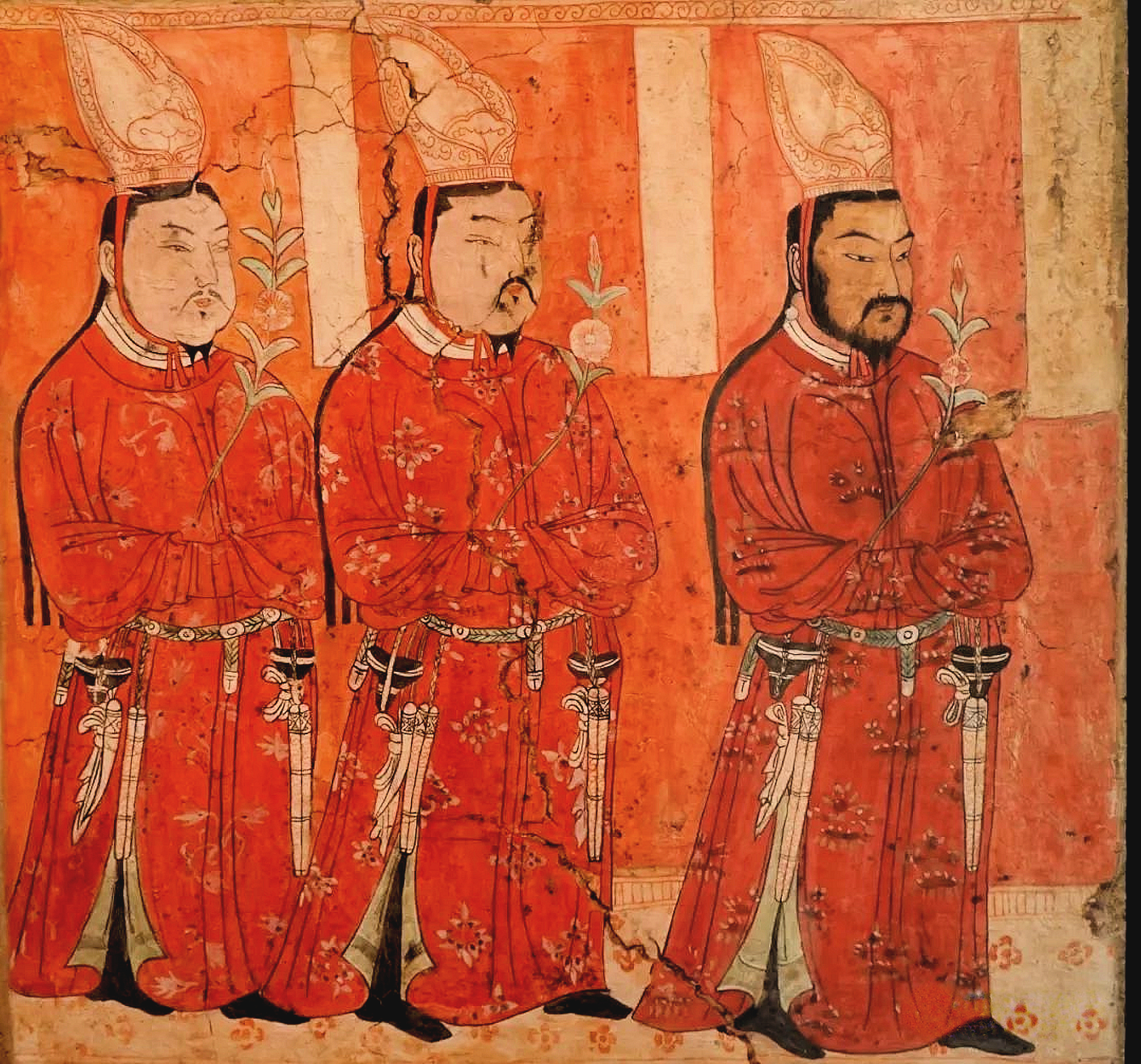
Uyghur princes wearing Chinese-styled robes and headgear. Bezeklik, Cave 9, 9–12th century.

In 758, the Uyghurs turned their attention to the northern Yenisei Kyrgyz. Bayanchur destroyed several of their trading outposts before defeating a Kyrgyz army and executing their khan.

On the ren-shen day of the fifth month of the first year of the Qianyuan reign [on March 29, 758 CE], The envoys from Hui-he [Uyghur Khaganate], Duo-yi-hai-a-bo and others, totaling eighty people, and an emir from the Black-robed Dashi [Abbasid Caliphate], Nao-wen and others, totaling eight people, come at the same time to pay a visit [to the Tang court]; when they walk to the side entrance of the palace, [both delegations] argue who should be the first [to see the Emperor]. The interpreters and palace secretaries arrange them as left team and right team, and enter through the Eastern Gate and the Western Gate all at once. [After this,] Wen-she-shi and the Black-robed Dashi envoy pay their visit [to the Chinese Emperor].

— Cefu Yuangui

In 759 the Uyghurs attempted to assist the Tang in stamping out the rebels but failed. Bayanchur died and his son Tengri Bögü succeeded him as Bögü Qaghan.

In 762 Bögü planned to invade the Tang with 4,000 soldiers but after negotiations switched sides and assisted them in defeating the rebels at Luoyang. After the battle the Uyghurs looted the city. When the people fled to Buddhist temples for protection, the Uyghurs burnt them down, killing over 10,000. For their aid, the Tang were forced to pay 100,000 pieces of silk to get them to leave. During the campaign Bögü encountered Manichaean priests who converted him to Manichaeism. From then on the official religion of the Uyghur Khaganate became Manichaeism.

=== Decline ===
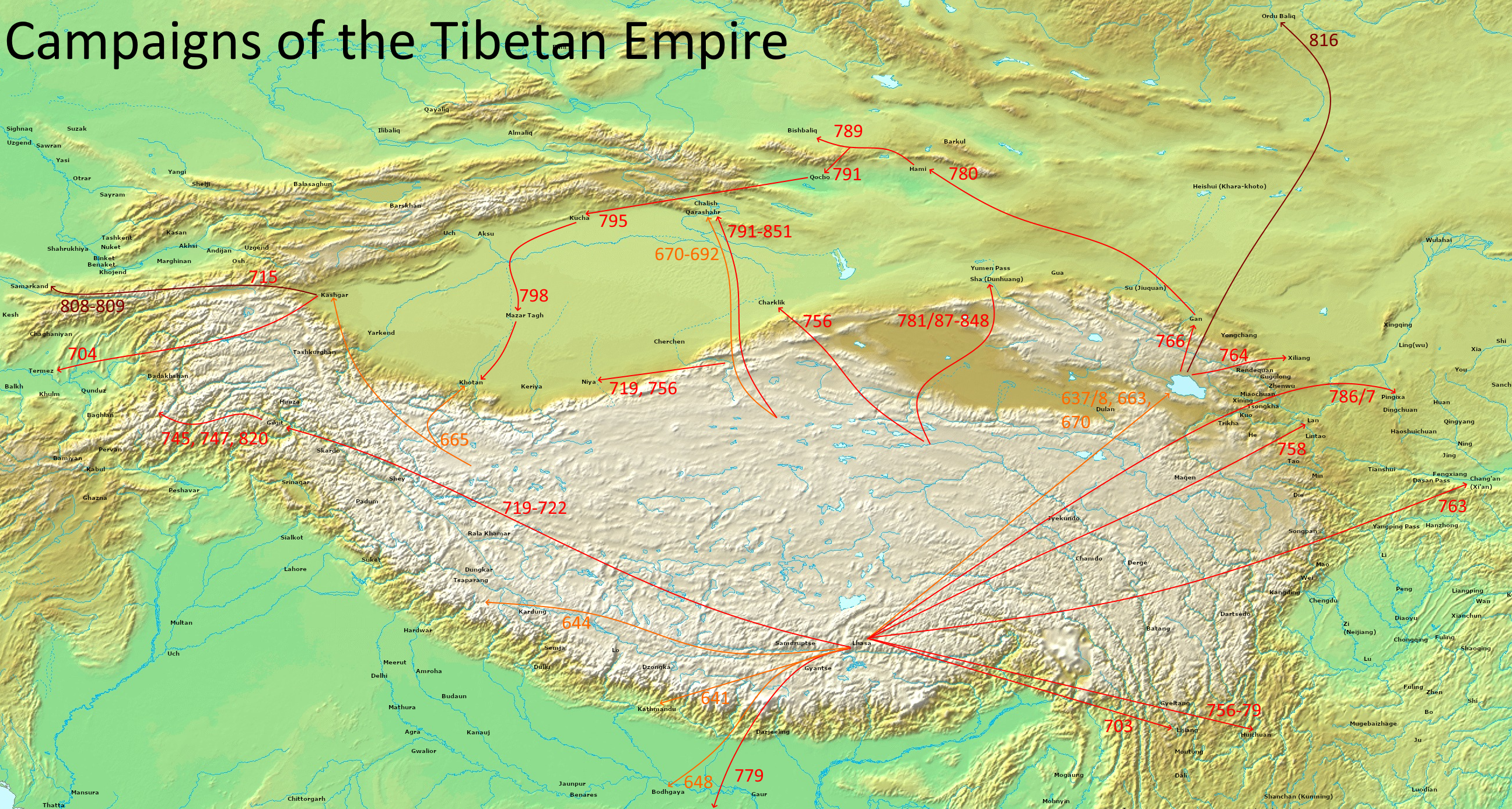
Campaigns of the Tibetan Empire, 7–9th centuries

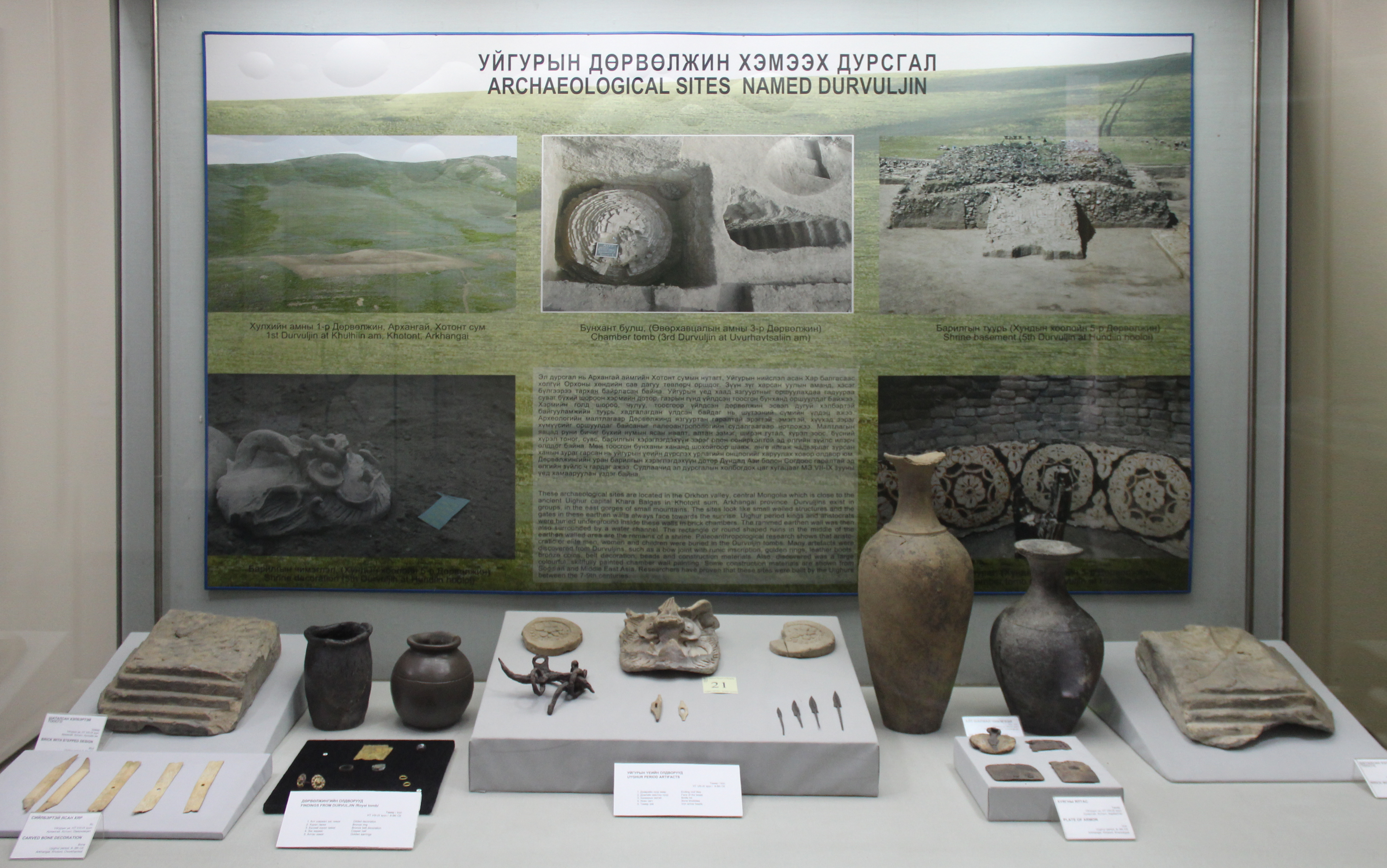
Uyghur Khaganate "Durvuljin" tombs, near the Uyghur capital of Khara Balgas, 7th–9th century. Orkhon Valley. National Museum of Mongolia

In 779, Bögü Qaghan planned to invade the Tang dynasty based on the advice of his Sogdian courtiers. However, his uncle, Tun Baga Tarkhan, opposed this plan and killed him and "nearly two thousand people from among the Kaghan's family, his clique and the Sogdians." Tun Bagha Tarkhan ascended the throne, and enforced a new set of laws, which he designed to secure the unity of the khaganate. During his reign, Manichaeism was suppressed, but his successors restored it as the official religion.

In 780, a group of Uyghurs and Sogdians was killed while leaving Chang'an with tribute. Tun demanded 1,800,000 strings of cash in compensation and the Tang agreed to pay this amount in gold and silk. In 789, Tun Bagha Tarkhan died and his son succeeded him as Külüg Qaghan. The Karluks took this opportunity to encroach on Uyghur territory and annexed Futu Valley. In 790, the Uyghurs and Tang forces were defeated by Tibetan Empire at Tingzhou (Beshbalik). Külüg Qaghan died, and his son succeeded him as Qutluq Bilge Qaghan.

In 791, the Tibetans attacked Lingzhou but were driven off by the Uyghurs, who presented captured prisoners and cattle to Emperor Dezong of Tang. The Tibetans and Karluks suffered another defeat against the Uyghurs at Beiting. The captured Tibetan general Zan Rgyal Sum was sent to Dezong. In 792, the Uyghurs, led by Qutluq's son Baoyi Qaghan, defeated the Tibetans and Karluks, taking Gaochang. Not long after the Tibetans attacked Yushu, a fortified town 560 li east of Kucha. They were besieged by Baoyi there and destroyed. In 795, Qutluq Bilge Qaghan died and the Yaghlakar dynasty came to an end. A general, Qutluq II, declared himself the new qaghan, founding a new dynasty, the Ädiz (CN. Adie Chinese: 阿跌氏).

In 803, the Uyghurs captured Gaochang. In 808, Qutluq II died and his son, Baoyi Qaghan, succeeded him. In the same year, the Uyghurs seized Liang Province from the Tibetans. In 816, a Tibetan raid reached within two days' journey of Ordu-Baliq. In 821, Baoyi Qaghan died, and his son, Chongde, succeeded him. Chongde was considered the last great khagan of the Uyghur Khaganate. His achievements included improved trade up with the region of Sogdia, and on the battlefield he repulsed a force of invading Tibetans in 821. After defeating the Tibetan and Karluk force, the Uyghurs entered the Principality of Ushrusana and plundered the region. In 822, the Uyghurs sent troops to help the Tang in quelling rebels. The Tang refused the offer but had to pay them 70,000 pieces of silk to go home. In 823, the Tibetan Empire waged war on the Uyghurs. In 824, Chongde died and was succeeded by a brother, Zhaoli Qaghan. In 832, Zhaoli was murdered. He was succeeded by the son of Chongde, Zhangxin Qaghan. In the same year, the Tibetan Empire failed to make war on the Uyghurs.

=== Fall ===
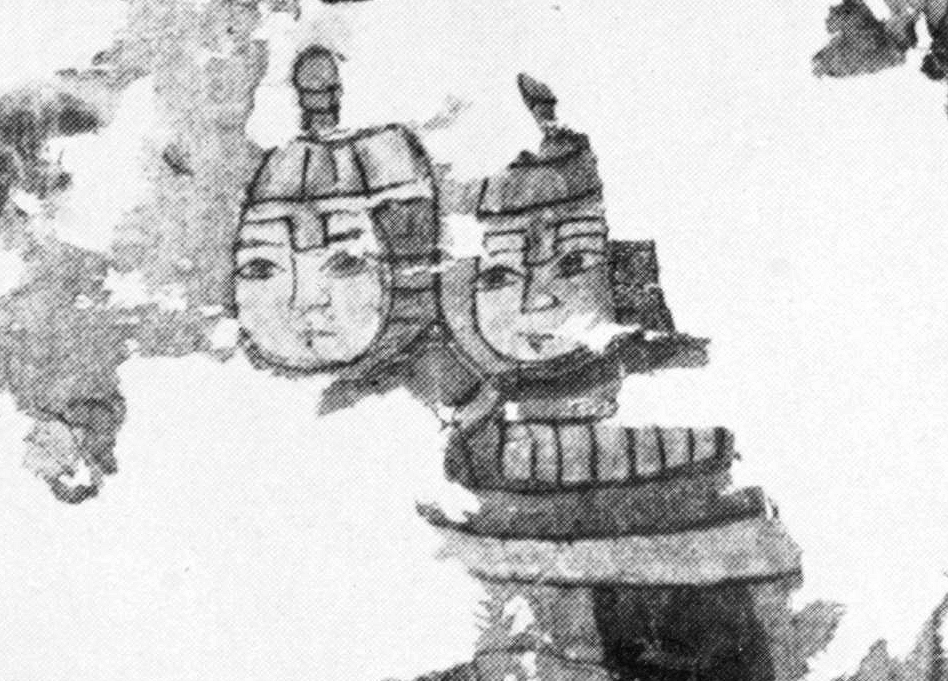
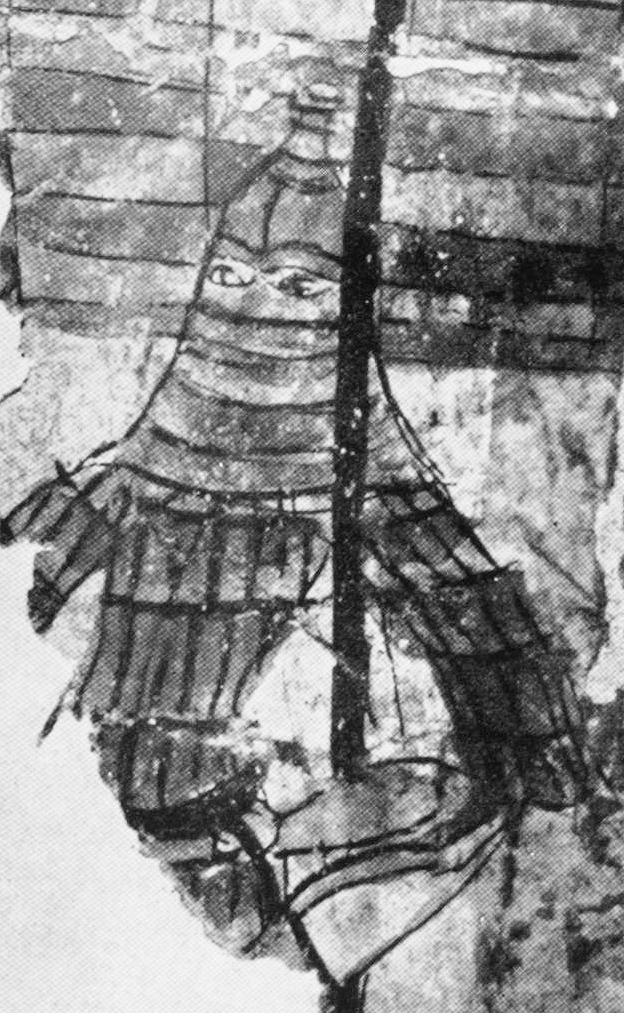
Painted silk fragments of men in armour, from a Manichaean Temple near Qocho. Turkic, 8th century or 9th century. Museum für Asiatische Kunst, Berlin.

In 839, Zhangxin Qaghan was forced to commit suicide and a minister named Qasar Qaghan seized the throne with the help of 20,000 Shatuo horsemen from Ordos. In the same year, there was a famine and an epidemic, with a particularly severe winter that killed much of the livestock the Uyghur economy was based on.

In 840, one of nine Uyghur ministers, Kulug Bagha, rival of Qasar, fled to the Yenisei Kyrgyz and invited them to invade from the north. With a force of around 80,000 horsemen, they sacked Ordu-Baliq, razing it to the ground. The Kyrgyz captured Qasar, and promptly beheaded him. They went on to destroy other cities throughout the Uyghur Empire, burning them to the ground. The Uyghurs fled in two groups. A 30,000-strong group led by the aristocrat Ormïzt sought refuge in Tang territory but Emperor Wuzong of Tang ordered the borders to be closed. The other group, 100,000 strong, led by Wujie Qaghan, son of Baoyi and the new khagan, also fled to Tang territory. However Wujie demanded a Tang city for residence as well as the protection of Manichaeans and food. Wuzong found the demands unacceptable and refused. He granted Ormïzt asylum in return for the use of his troops against Wujie. Two years later, Wuzong extended the order to ban Christianity, Zoroastrianism, and especially Buddhism.

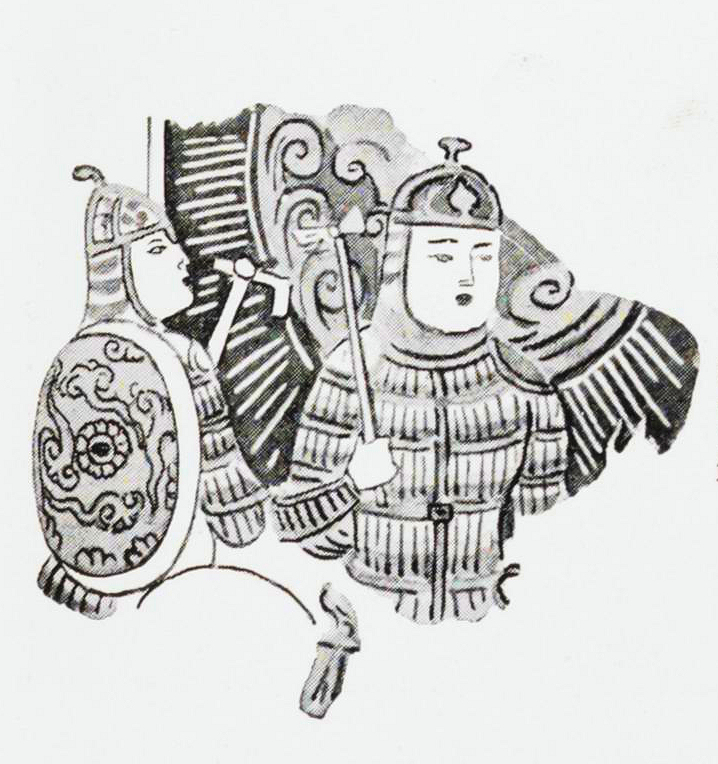
Soldiers from Karasahr, 8th century CE

The Yenisei Kyrgyz and Tang dynasty launched a successful war between 840 and 848 against the Uyghur Khaganate using their claimed familial ties as justification for an alliance.

In 841, Wujie led the Uyghurs in an invasion of today's Shaanxi.

In 843, a Tang army led by Shi Xiong attacked the Uyghurs and killed 10,000 on February 13, 843, at "Kill the Barbarians" Mountain (Shahu). Wujie was wounded. After the defeat of Wujie, Wuzong ordered Ormïzt's troops to be broken up and dispersed among different units. Ormïzt refused to obey. His troops were massacred by general Liu Mian. With the defeat of the two major Uyghur groups, Wuzong saw his chance to get rid of the Manichaeans. He ordered Manichaean temples in several cities to be destroyed, the confiscation of their estates, and the execution of the clergy.

In the fourth moon of 843, an imperial edict was issued [ordering] the Manichaean priests of the empire to be killed. [...] The Manichaean priests are highly respected by the Uighurs.

— Ennin

In 846, Wujie was killed after having spent his 6-year reign fighting the Kyrgyz, the supporters of his rival Ormïzt, a brother of Qasar, and Tang dynasty troops in Ordos and today Shaanxi. His brother, Enian Qaghan, was decisively defeated by Tang forces in 847.

=== Successors ===
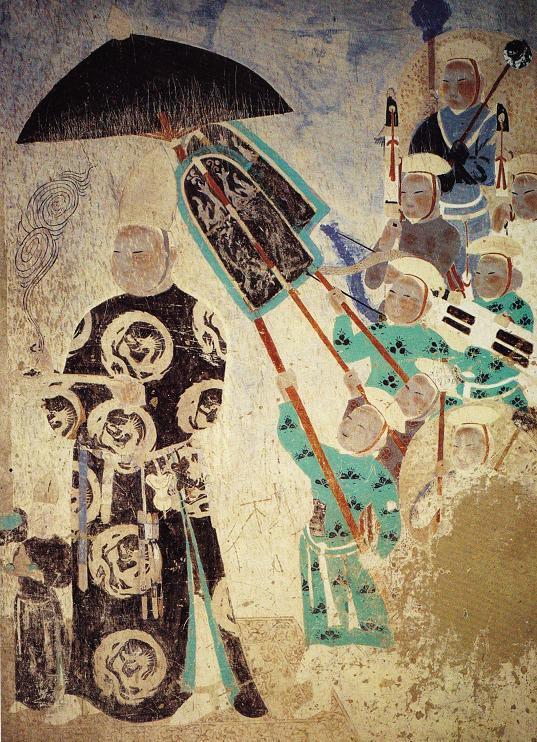
Uyghur king from Turfan region attended by servants. Mogao cave 409, 11th–13th century.

The Yenisei Kyrgyz which replaced the Uyghur Khaganate had little interest in running the empire which they had destroyed. They held the territory from Lake Baikal in the east to the Irtysh River in the west and left Kulug Bagha, the Uyghur who defected to them, in charge of the Orkhon Valley. During the reign of Emperor Yizong of Tang (860–873), there were three recorded instances of contact between the Tang and Kyrgyz, but the nature of their relationship is unclear. Tang policy makers argued that there was no point in building any relations with the Kyrgyz since the Uyghurs no longer threatened them. The Khitans seized the Orkhon Valley from the Kyrgyz in 890 and no further opposition from the Kyrgyz is recorded.

The Khitan ruler Abaoji did extend his influence onto the Mongolian Plateau in 924, but there is no indication whatsoever of any conflict with the Kyrgyz. The only information we have from Khitan (Liao) sources regarding the Kyrgyz indicates that the two powers maintained diplomatic relations. Scholars who write of a Kyrgyz "empire" from about 840 to about 924 are describing a fantasy. All available evidence suggests that despite some brief extensions of their power onto the Mongolian Plateau, the Kyrgyz did not maintain a significant political or military presence there after their victories in the 840s.

— Michael Drompp

After the fall of the Uyghur Khaganate, the Uyghurs migrated south and established the Ganzhou Uyghur Kingdom in modern Gansu and the Kingdom of Qocho near modern Turpan. The Uyghurs in Qocho converted to Buddhism, and, according to Mahmud al-Kashgari, were "the strongest of the infidels", while the Ganzhou Uyghurs were conquered by the Tangut people in the 1030s. Even so, Kashgari praised contemporary Uyghurs as bilingual Turkophones whose Turkic dialect remained "pure" and "most correct" (just like dialects spoken by monolingual Yagmas, and Tuhsis); meanwhile, Kashgari derided other bilingual Turkophones (Qay, Tatars, Basmyls, Chömüls, Yabakus, etc.), for incorporating foreign loanwords and "slurring" in their speech. In 1134, Qocho became a vassal of Yelü Dashi's nascent Qara Khitai empire. In 1209, the Qocho ruler Idiqut ("Lord of happiness") Barchuk Art Tegin declared his allegiance to Genghis Khan, and the Uyghurs became important civil servants in the later Mongol Empire, which adapted the Old Uyghur alphabet as its official script. According to the New Book of Tang, a third group went to seek refuge among the Karluks.

The Karluks, together with other tribes such as the Chigils and Yagmas, later founded the Kara-Khanid Khanate (940–1212). Some historians associate the Karakhanids with the Uyghurs as the Yaghmas were linked to the Toquz Oghuz. Sultan Satuq Bughra Khan, believed to be a Yagma from Artux, converted to Islam in 932 and seized control of Kashgar in 940, giving rise to the new dynasty, known as Karakhanids.

== Relationship with the Sogdians ==
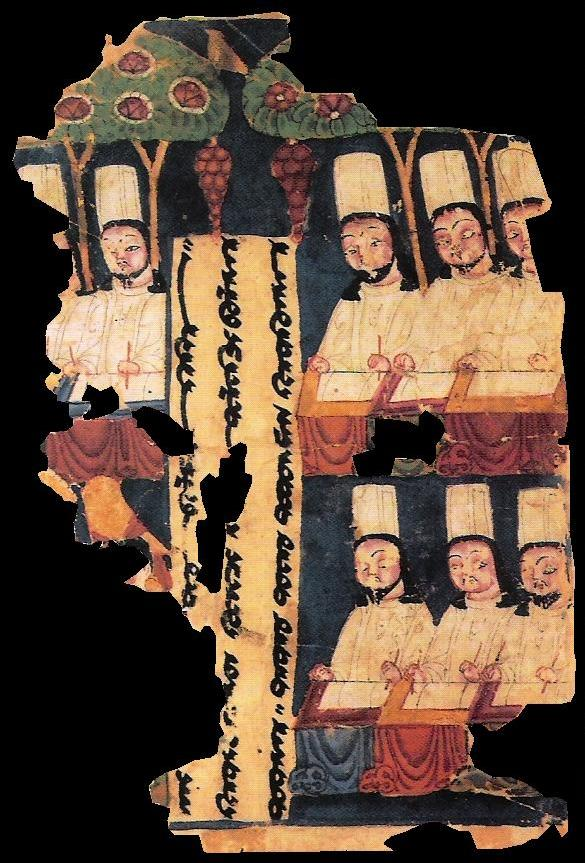
Manichean scribes from Qocho, 8th–9th century

To control trade along the Silk Road, the Uyghurs established a trading relationship with the Sogdian merchants who controlled some oases of Central Asia. The Uyghur adoption of Manichaeism was one aspect of this relationship—choosing Manichaeism over Buddhism may have been motivated by a desire to show independence from Tang influence. Not all Uyghurs supported conversion – an inscription at Ordu-Baliq states that Manichaens tried to divert people from their ancient shamanistic beliefs. A rather partisan account from a Uyghur-Manichean text of that period demonstrates the unbridled enthusiasm Bögü Qaghan had for Manichaeism:

"At that time when the divine Bögü Qaghan had thus spoken, we the Elects of all the people living within the land rejoiced. It is impossible to describe this ourjoy. The people told the story to one another and rejoiced. At that time, groups of thousands and tens of thousands assembled and with pastimes of all sorts they entertained themselves even unto dawn. And at the break of the day they made a short fast. The divine ruler Bögü Qaghan and all the elects of his retinue mounted on horses, and all the princes and the princesses led by those of high repute, the big and the small, the whole people, amidst great rejoicing proceeded to the gate of the city. And when the divine ruler had entered the city, he put the crown on his head... and sat upon the golden throne."

— Uyghur-Manichean text.

As conversion was based on political and economic concerns regarding trade with the Sogdians, it was driven by the rulers and often encountered resistance in lower societal strata. Furthermore, as the khaghan's political power depended on his ability to provide economically for his subjects, "alliance with the Sogdians through adopting their religion was an important way of securing this objective." Both the Sogdians and the Uyghurs benefited enormously from this alliance. The Sogdians enabled the Uyghurs to trade in the Western Regions and exchange silk from China for other goods. For the Sogdians it provided their Chinese trading communities with Uyghur protection. The 5th and 6th centuries saw large emigration of Sogdians to China. The Sogdians were the main traders along the Silk Roads, and China was always their biggest market. Among the paper clothing found in the Astana cemetery near Turfan is a list of taxes paid on caravan trade in the Gaochang kingdom in the 620s. The text is incomplete, but out of the 35 commercial operations it lists, 29 involve a Sogdian trader. Ultimately both rulers of nomadic origin and sedentary states recognized the importance of merchants like the Sogdians and made alliances to further their own agendas in controlling the Silk Road.

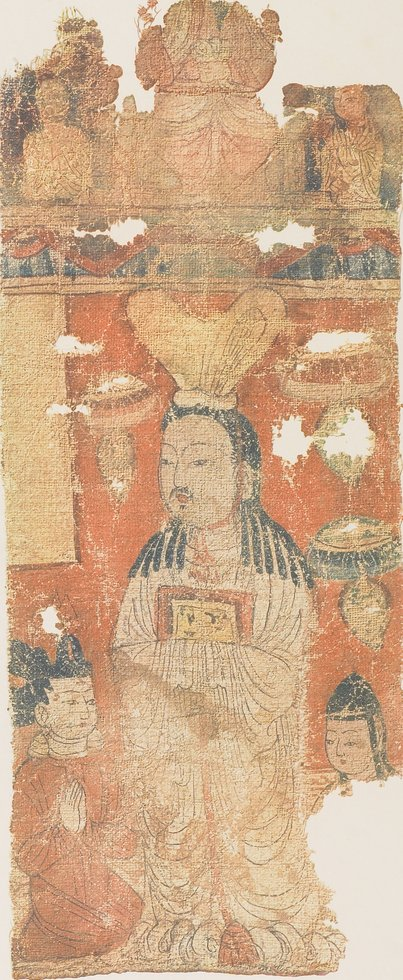
Uyghur Manichaean Elect depicted on a temple banner from Qocho

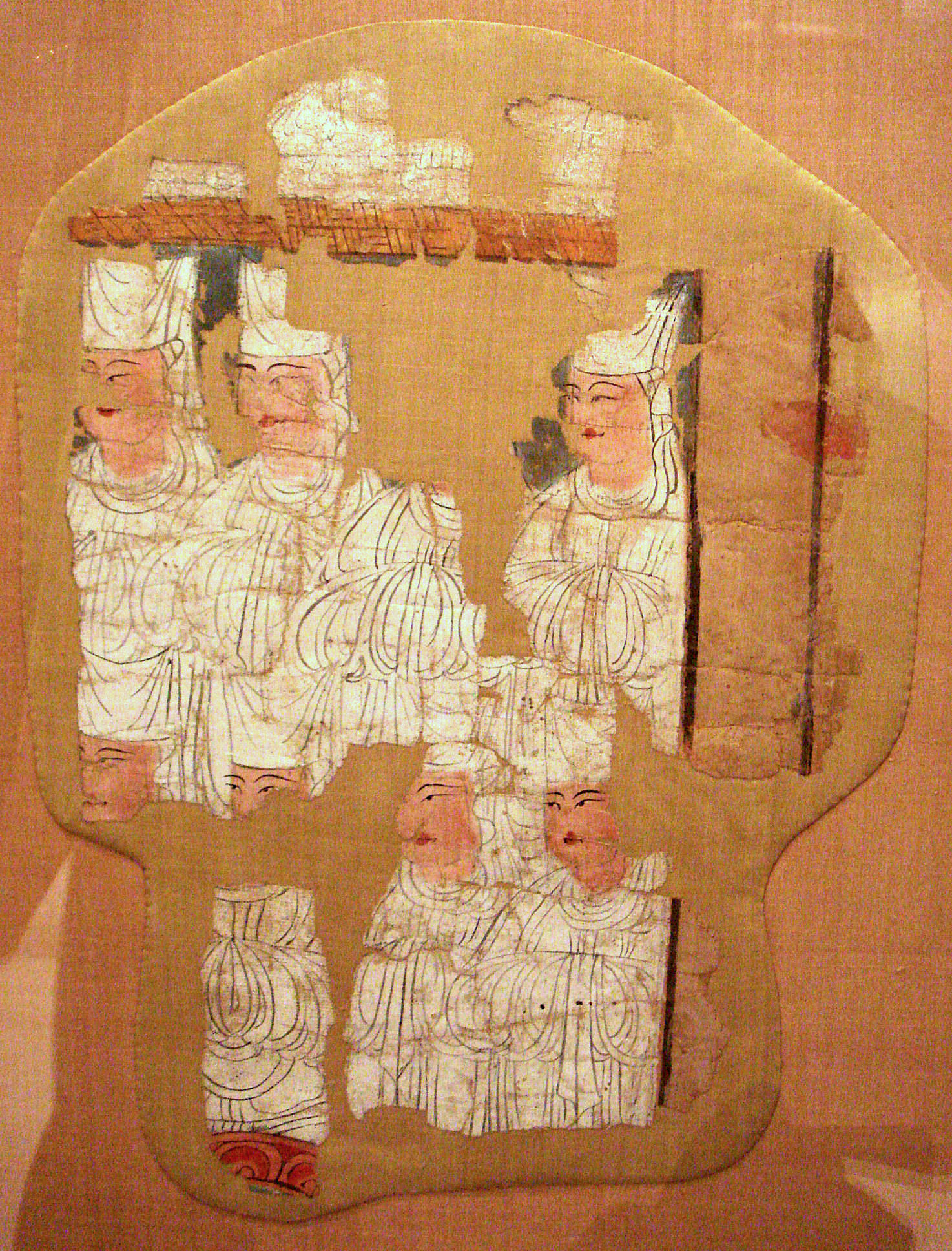
Uyghur Manichaean Electae (female Chosen ones) from Qocho

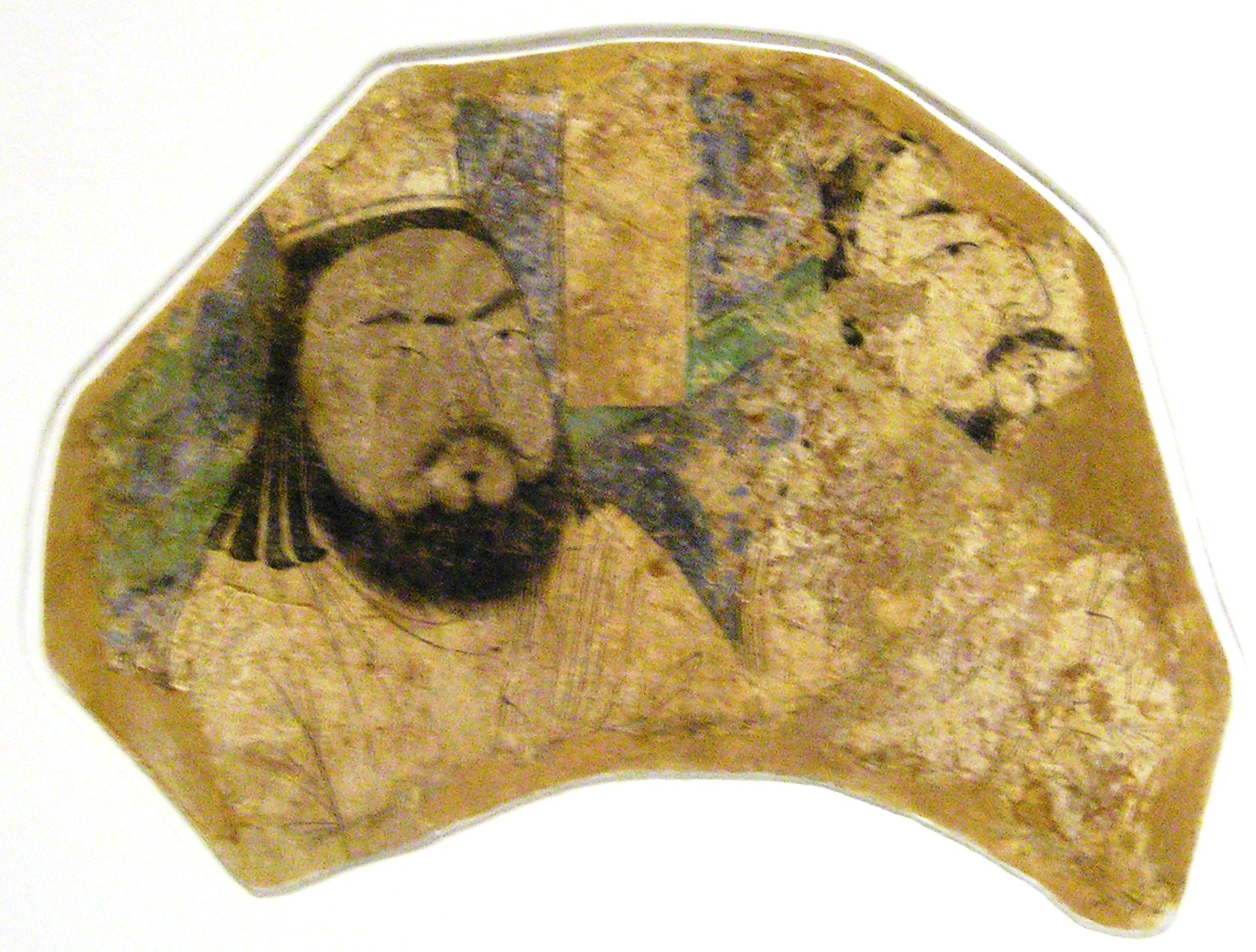
Uyghur Manichaean clergymen from Qocho

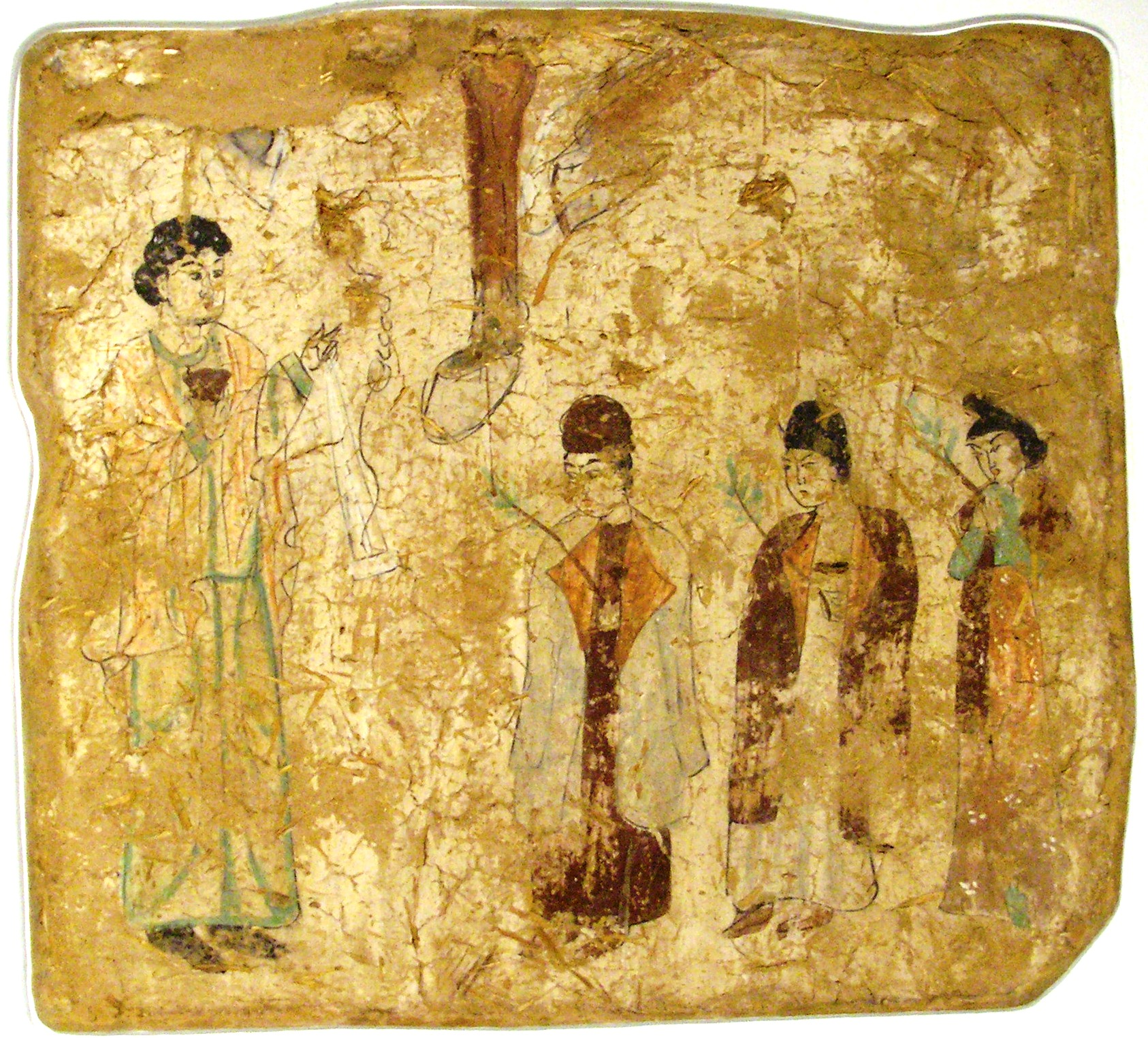
Fresco of Palm Sunday from Qocho

== Ordu-Baliq ==
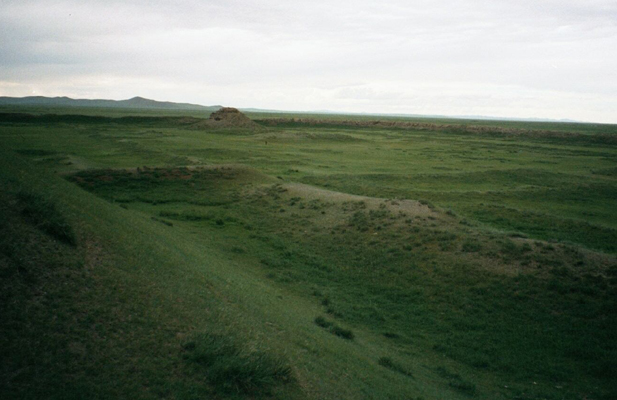
Ordu-Baliq, capital of the Uyghur Khaganate (744–840) in Mongolia

The Uyghurs created an empire with clear Persian influences, particularly in areas of government. Soon after the empire was founded, they emulated sedentary states by establishing a permanent, settled capital, Ordu-Baliq, built on the site of the former Göktürk imperial capital, northwest of the later Mongol capital, Karakorum. The city was a fully fortified commercial center, typical along the Silk Road, with concentric walls and lookout towers, stables, military and commercial stores, and administrative buildings. Certain areas of the town were allotted for trade and handcrafts, while in the center of the town were palaces and temples, including a monastery. The palace had fortified walls and two main gates, as well as moats filled with water and watchtowers.

The khaghan maintained his court there and decided the policies of the empire. With no fixed settlement, the Xiongnu had been limited in their acquisition of Chinese goods to what they could carry. As stated by Thomas Barfield, "the more goods a nomadic society acquired the less mobility it had, hence, at some point, one was more vulnerable trying to protect a rich treasure house by moving it than by fortifying it." By building a fixed city, the Uyghurs created a protected storage space for trade goods from China. They could hold a stable, fixed court, receive traders, and effectively cement their central role in Silk Road exchange. However, the vulnerability that came with having a fixed city was to be the downfall of the Uyghurs.

== List of Uyghur Khagans ==
The following list is based on Yihong Pan's "Sui-Tang Foreign Policy: Four case studies".

Personal Name	Turkic title	Chinese title	Reign
Kutlug Bilge Qaghan Yaoluoge Yibiaobi	Qutlugh Bilge Köl Qaghan	Huairen Khagan (懷仁可汗)	744–747
Bayanchur Qaghan Yaoluoge Moyanchuo	Tengrida Bolmish El Etmish Bilge Qaghan	Yingwu Weiyuan Pijia Qaghan (英武威遠毗伽闕可汗)	747–759
Bogu Qaghan Yaoluoge Yidijian	Tengrida Qut Bolmish El Tutmish Alp Külüg Bilge Qaghan	Yingyi Qaghan (英義可汗)	759–780
Tun Baga Tarkhan Yaoluoge Dunmohe	Alp Qutlugh Bilge Qaghan	Wuyi Chenggong Qaghan (武義成功可汗) Changshou Tianqin Qaghan (長壽天親可汗)	780–789
Kulug Bilge Qaghan Yaoluoge Duoluosi	Külüg Bilge Qaghan	Zhongzhen Qaghan (忠貞可汗)	789–790
Qutluq Bilge Qaghan Yaoluoge Achuo	Qutluq Bilge Qaghan	Fengcheng Qaghan (奉誠可汗)	790–795
Qutluq II Bilge Qaghan Adie Guduolu, later Yaoluoge Guduolu	Ay Tengride Ulugh Bolmish Alp Qutluq Külüg Bilge Qaghan	Huaixin Qaghan (懷信可汗)	795–808
Baoyi Qaghan	Ay Tengride Qut Bolmish Alp Bilge Qaghan	Baoyi Qaghan (保義可汗)	808–821
Chongde Qaghan	Kün Tengride Ulugh Bolmish Küçlüg Bilge Qaghan	Chonde Qaghan (崇德可汗)	821–824
Zhaoli Qaghan	Ay Tengride Qut Bolmish Alp Bilge Qaghan	Zhaoli Qaghan (昭禮可汗)	824–833
Zhangxin Qaghan Yaoluoge Hu	Ay Tengride Qut Bolmish Alp Külüg Bilge Qaghan	Zhangxin Qaghan (彰信可汗)	833–839
Qasar Qaghan (Usurper) Jueluowu or Yaoluoge Hesa		Qasar Qaghan (㕎馺特勒)	839–840
Uge Qaghan Yaoluoge Wuxi		Wujie Qaghan (烏介可汗)	841–846
Enian Qaghan Yaoluoge E'nian		Enian Qaghan (遏捻可汗)	846–848

== Genetics ==
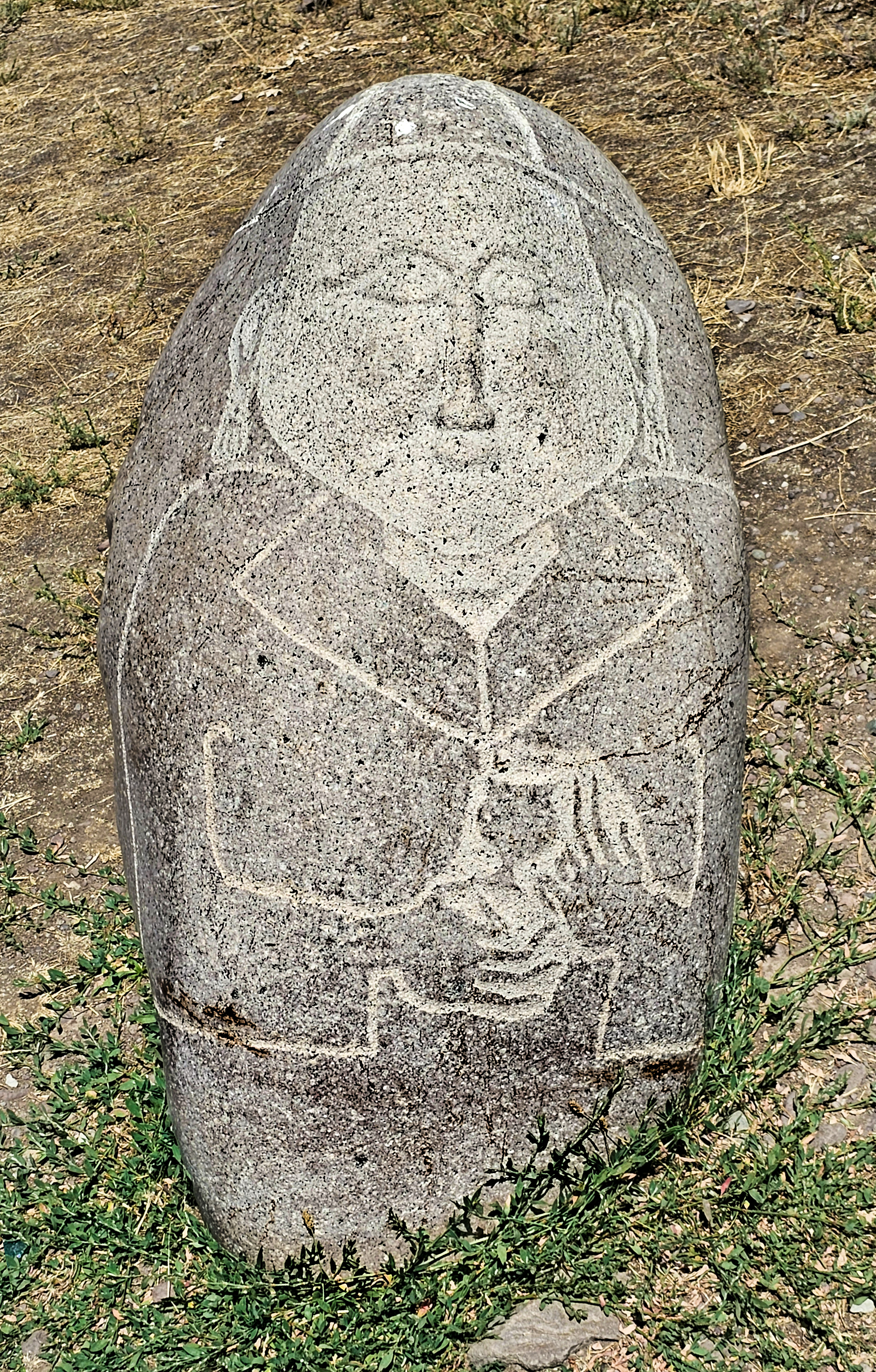
Uyghur Balbal stele. Burana, Kyrgyzstan

A 2020 study analyzed the genetic ancestry of 12 Uyghur Khaganate individuals c. 9th century from Mongolia. The sample exhibited high (~60%) but variable West Eurasian ancestry, modeled as a mixture of Indo-Iranian Alans and Bactria-Margiana Archaeological Complex ancestry. The sample also carried substantial (~40%) ancestry from an East Asian source, closely related to the Slab Grave culture. The admixture between West and East Eurasian sources was estimated to have occurred around the year 500.

Of the 5 Uyghur males analyzed, 4 (or 80%) carried the West Eurasian paternal haplogroup Haplogroup R1b, while 1 (or 20%) carried the East Eurasian haplogroup Q1a. Of the 12 maternal haplogroups detected, 58% were of East Eurasian origin (A, B, D, G) while 41% were of West Eurasian origin (J T, H).

An Uyghur Male carried East Eurasian Y Haplogroup C2 and mtDNA haplogroup D4.

An Uyghur remain (GD1-3) analysed in a 2024 study was found to have carried primarily ancestry derived from Ancient Northeast Asians (c. 83% ±2–3%) with the remainder of ancestry being derived from Western Steppe Herders (Sarmatians; c. 17% ±2–3%). The authors note that this is "providing a new piece of information on this understudied period".

== Buddhist and Manichean Uyghur artifacts ==
Below is a set of images of Buddhist and Manichean Uyghurs, found from the Bezeklik caves and Mogao grottoes.

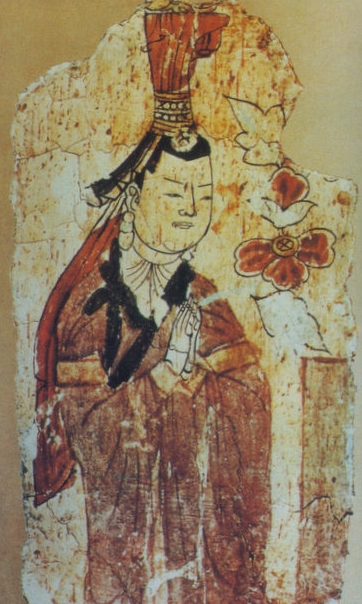
Uyghur woman from the Bezeklik murals

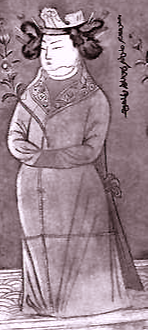
Uyghur princesses

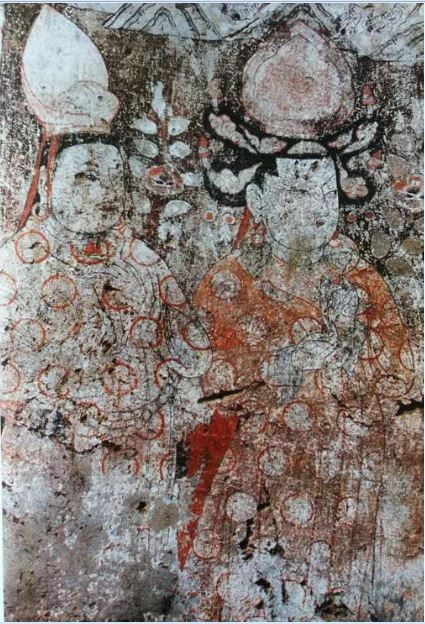
Uyghur donors

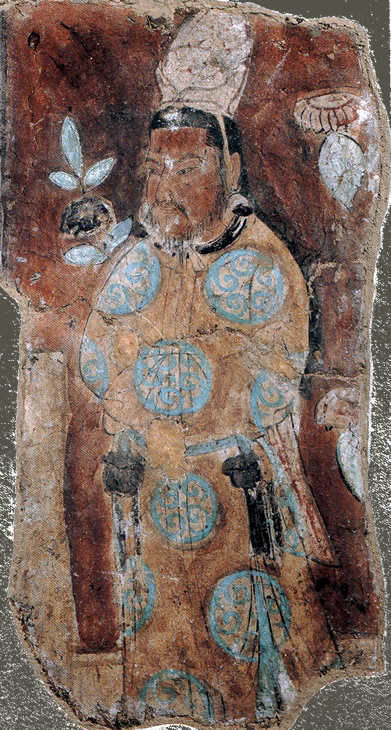
Uyghur prince from the Bezeklik murals

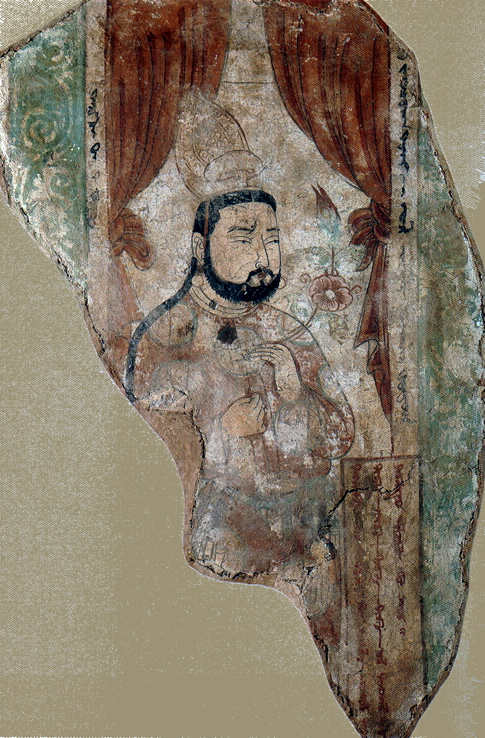
Uyghur noble from the Bezeklik murals

== See also ==
- Ethnic groups in Chinese history
- Guo Ziyi
- History of Turkic people
