= Bayanchur Khan =

Khagan of Uyghur Khaganate (747-759)

Eletmish Bilge Qaghan
- Qaghan of the Uygur Khaganate

Qaghan of the Uyghurs
- Reign: 747–759
- Predecessor: Kutlug Bilge Khagan
- Successor: Bögü Qaghan
- Born: Yàolúogě Mòyánchùo (藥羅葛磨延啜); 713; Near Gansu, Hanhai Protectorate (瀚海), Hangai Mountains
- Died: May 759 (aged 45–46)
- Spouse: Elbilge Khatun; Princess Xiaoguo (蕭國公主)
Regnal name
- Tengrida Bolmish El Etmish Bilge Qaghan (𐱅𐰭𐰼𐰃𐰓𐰀⁚𐰉𐰆𐰞𐰢𐱁⁚𐰠𐱅𐰢𐰾𐰋𐰠𐰏𐰀⁚𐰴𐰍𐰣); Heavenborn State Founding Wise Qaghan
- House: Yaglakar clan
- Father: Kutlug Bilge Khagan
- Religion: Tengrism

Mo-yun Chur (磨延啜) (713–759) or Eletmish Bilge Qaghan was second qaghan of Uyghur Khaganate. His Tang dynasty invested title was Yingwu Weiyuan Pijia Qaghan (Chinese: 英武威遠毗伽闕可汗; lit. 'Brave and Martial qaghan', 'that awes the distant lands') or simply Yingwu Qaghan (Chinese: 英武可汗; lit. 'Brave and Martial qaghan'). He was also known as Gelei Qaghan (Chinese: 葛勒可汗; pinyin: Gélēi Kèhán). His official regnal name in Turkic was Tengrida Bolmish Eletmish Bilge Qaghan (Old Turkic: 𐱅𐰭𐰼𐰃𐰓𐰀⁚𐰉𐰆𐰞𐰢𐱁⁚𐰠𐱅𐰢𐰾𐰋𐰠𐰏𐰀⁚𐰴𐰍𐰣, romanized: Teŋride bolmuš El Etmiš Bilge Qaɣan, lit. 'Tengri-born State Founder Wise Qahgan'). He ordered the erection of the Tariat Inscriptions.

== Biography ==
=== Early life ===
Bayanchur Khan was born in 713 in the Hanhai Protectorate (瀚海) near Ganzhou and Lanzhou to Kutluk Boyla. At time of his birth, clan chief Yaoluoge Dujiezhi (藥羅葛獨解支) had recently moved near the Tang border, avoiding expansion of the Second Turkic Khaganate. Yaoluoge Dujiezhi died in 715 and was succeeded by his son Yaoluoge Fudifu, who was followed by his son Yaoluoge Chengzong (藥羅葛承宗) sometime later. In 727, at the suggestion of the general Wang Junchuo (王君㚟), Emperor Xuanzong of Tang commissioned Wang Junchuo to attack the Tibetan Empire, and after a Tibetan incursion in late 726, Wang counterattacked and inflicted losses on the Tibetan forces commanded by the general Xinuoluogonglu (悉諾邏恭祿). Later in the year though, Xinuoluogonglu and another general, Zhulongmangbuzhi (燭龍莽布支) attacked and captured Wang's home prefecture Gua Prefecture (瓜州, roughly modern Jiuquan, Gansu), taking Wang's father Wang Shou (王壽) captive. As a result, Wang Junchuo did not dare to counterattack, and subsequently blamed the defeat on a number of tribal chiefs in the area and had them exiled. In response, Bayanchur's grandfather Yaoluoge Hushu (藥羅葛護輸) – the nephew of Yaoluoge Chengzong – ambushed Wang Junchuo and killed him, and while Yaoluoge Hushu was forced to flee thereafter, for several years the Tang dynasty did not engage in any offensive campaigns in the region. The 14 year old Bayanchur and his brothers had to follow his grandfather into exile.

He was made the eastern shad in 744 by his father Kutlug Bilge Khagan, who made his elder brother Tay Bilge Tutuq the yabgu of the west and heir. He spent the next 6 years ousting him to become heir.

=== Reign ===
He spent 3 years fully consolidating his rule after he succeeded in his father in 747. He captured and executed his brother Tay Bilge Tutuq who was supported by the Karluks, Basmyls, and Khitans in 750. He was enthroned in Ordu-Baliq, a new capital that was built by Chinese and Sogdian architects. His royal court consisted of 60 nobles, Court Secretary Inancu Baga Tarkan and Chief Minister Bilge Tay Sanggun. He also appointed his sons as viceroys over the western (Tardush) and eastern (Töles) tribes.

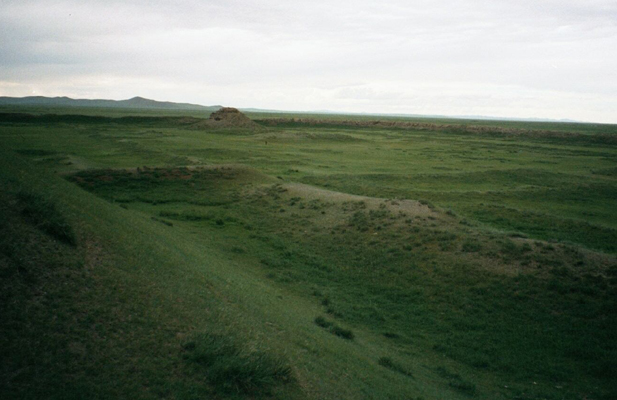
Ruins of Ordu-Baliq, a city founded by Bayanchur.

==== Involvement in An Lushan rebellion ====
Emperor Suzong of Tang appealed to Bayanchur in 756 for help against An Lushan, sending his second cousin Li Chengcai (李承寀), Prince of Dunhuang and Pugu Huai'en as emissaries. Uyghur troops were instrumental in dealing with rebellion. Uyghur forces led by Uyghur prince Ulu Bilge Yabgu and General Dide arrived at Emperor Suzong's headquarters at Fengxiang (鳳翔, in modern Baoji) to join the elite Tang forces recalled from the Anxi Circuit and the Western Regions. Emperor Suzong did so by promising that the Uyghur forces would be permitted to pillage the Chang'an region once it was recaptured. The Chinese chancellor Li Mi suggested that these forces be used to attack An Lushan's power base at Fanyang first, stop the possibility of a recovery. Emperor Suzong chose not to do so and decided to attack Chang'an first, with Li Chu in command of the joint forces. The forces recaptured Chang'an in the fall of 757, allowing Emperor Suzong to rebuild his administration in the capital. The Uyghurs were set on pillaging Chang'an, but Li Chu begged Ulu Bilge Yabgu to plead to delay the pillage—pointing out that if pillaging were carried out, the people of the eastern capital Luoyang, then serving as Yan's capital, would resist heavily, and asking that the Uyghurs pillage Luoyang instead.

=== Death ===
Bayanchur Khan died soon after completion of his successful expedition against the Yenisei Kirghiz in the Sayan Mountains in May of 759 during a feast.

== Family ==
Bayanchur was married to a Uyghur who was made El Bilge Khatun (Old Turkic: 𐰠𐰋𐰠𐰏𐰀𐰴𐱃𐰆𐰣) in 747 and Princess Xiaoguo (蕭公主) on 25 August 758 and was daughter of Emperor Suzong of Tang. Marriage to a true daughter of a Chinese emperor was unprecedented. She left for China after Bayanchur's death. Bayanchur had at least two sons:

1. Ulu Bilge Tardush Yabghu – commander of western part of the empire, who was commanding officer of Uyghurs in An Lushan rebellion, thought to be executed by his father in 759.
2. Bögü Qaghan – commander of eastern part of the empire, succeeded his father.

He also adopted his sister-in-law and married her to Prince Li Chengcai (李承采), Prince of Dunhuang (敦煌王李承采), son of Li Shouli, Prince of Bin in 758. She was made Princess Pijia (毗伽公主) by Emperor Suzong.

== In popular culture ==
- Portrayed by Yu Xiaowei in The Glory of Tang Dynasty. (2017)
