= Ordu-Baliq =

Ancient Uyghur Khaganate capital in Mongolia

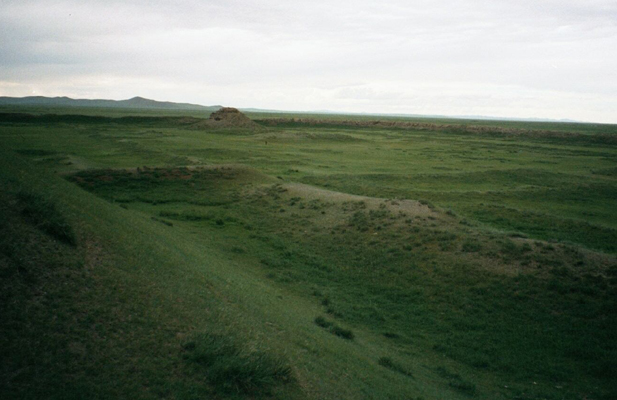
- The west gate as seen from the citadel

- Location of Ordu Baliq in Mongolia
- 47.431111°N 102.659444°E
- Location: Arkhangai Province, Mongolia

Ordu-Baliq (Note: also spelled Ordu Balykh, Ordu Balik, Ordu-Balïq, Ordu Balig, Ordu Baligh) (meaning "city of the court", "city of the army"; Chinese: 窩魯朵八里), also known as Mubalik and Karabalghasun, was the capital of the Uyghur Khaganate. It was built on the site of the former Göktürk imperial capital, 27 km (17 mi) north-to-northwest of the later Mongol capital, Karakorum. Its ruins are known as Kharbalgas (Хар Балгас) in Mongolian, which means "black ruins". They form part of the Orkhon Valley Cultural Landscape World Heritage Site.

== Location ==
Ordu-Baliq is in a grassy plain called the Talal-khain-dala steppe, on the western bank of the Orkhon River in the Khotont sum of the Arkhangai Province, Mongolia. The Orkhon emerges from the gorges of the Khangai Mountains and flows northward to meet the Tuul River, which has on its upper reaches the current capital of Mongolia, Ulaanbaatar.

A favorable micro-climate makes the location ideal for pasturage, and it lies along the most important east-west route across Mongolia. As a result, the Orkhon Valley was a center of habitation and important political and economic activity long before the birth of Genghis Khan, who made it known to the wider world.

== History ==
In 744, after the defeat of the last Göktürk Kaghan by the Uyghur-Karluk-Basmyl alliance, the Uyghurs under Bayanchur Khan (Bayan Çor) established their imperial capital Ordu Baliq on the site of the old ördü ("nomadic capital"). Ordu-Baliq flourished until 840, when it was reduced to ruin by the invading Yenisei Kyrgyz.

The capital occupied at least 32 km^{2} (12 sq mi). The ruins of the palace or temple complex (360 by 404 metres (1,181 by 1,325 ft))— which include ten one metre (3.3 ft) high double clay walls four metres (13 ft) apart, 14 watch towers—eight on the southern side and six on the northern side—two main entrances, one on the east and the other on the west, a twelve-metre (39 ft) high citadel in the southeast corner and a 14-metre (46 ft) high stupa in the center — indicate that Ordu-Baliq was a large, affluent town.

The urban area has three main parts. The largest and central part consists of numerous buildings surrounded by a continuous wall. Ruins of a large number of temples and houses are found south of the center. The khan's residential palace, also ringed by walls on all sides, stood in the northeastern part of the town, where Russian archaeologist Nikolay Yadrintsev discovered a green granite monument with a statue of a dragon perched at the top, bearing a runic inscription glorifying the khagans.

Ordu Baliq was a fully fortified commandry and commercial entrepot typical of the central points along the length of the Silk Road. The well-preserved remains now consist of concentric fortified walls and lookout towers, stables, military and commercial stores, and administrative buildings. There are remains of a water drainage system. Archaeologists established that certain areas were allotted for trade and handcrafts, while in the center of the town were palaces and temples, including a monastery. The palace had fortified walls around it and two main gates, east and west, as well as moats filled with water and watchtowers.

The architectural style and planning of the city appear to have close parallels with Tang Chinese models, although some elements appear to have derived inspiration from elsewhere.

=== Historical accounts ===
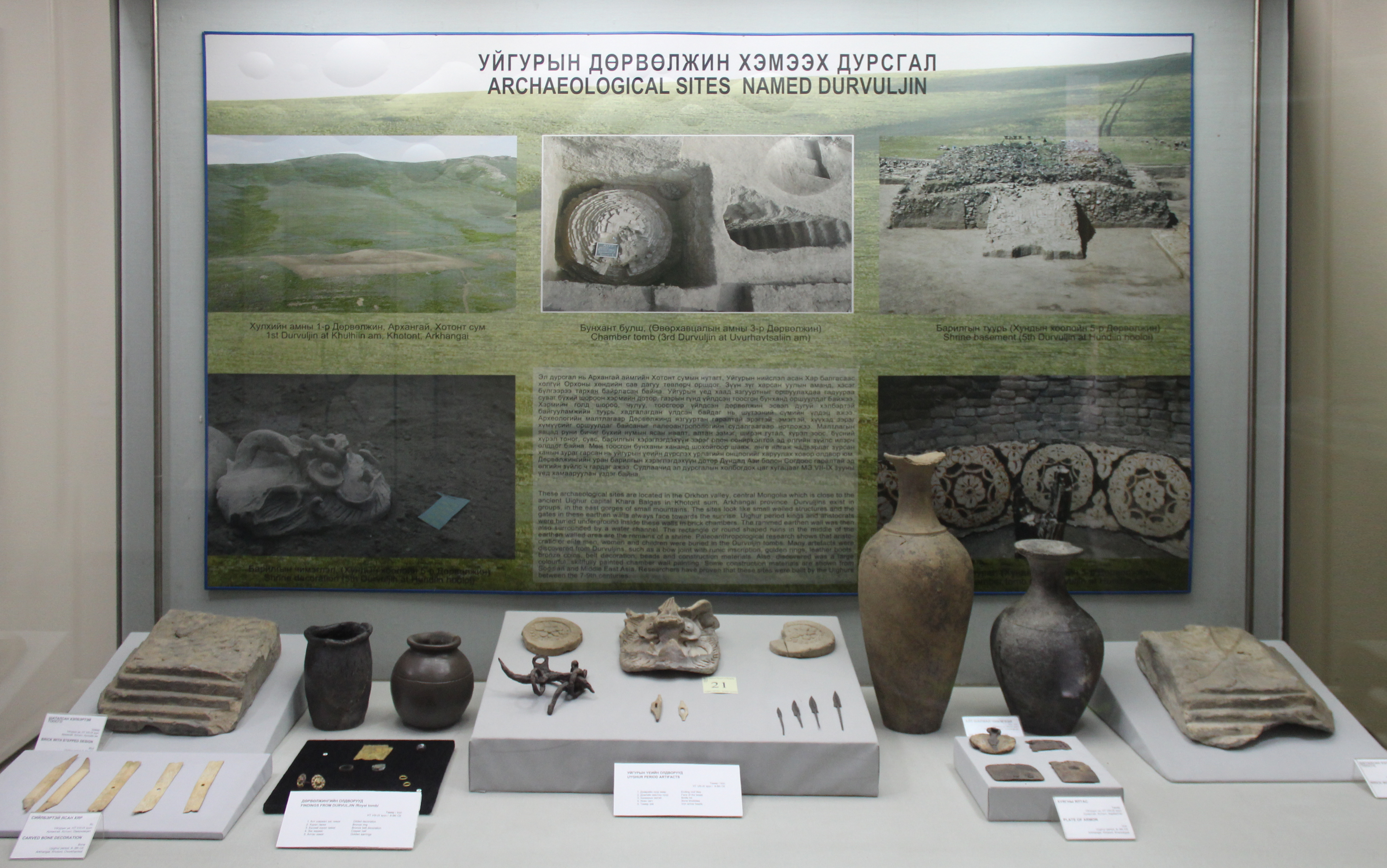
Uyghur Khaganate Durvuljin tombs, near the Uyghur capital of Khara Balgas, 7th-9th century AD. Orkhon Valley.

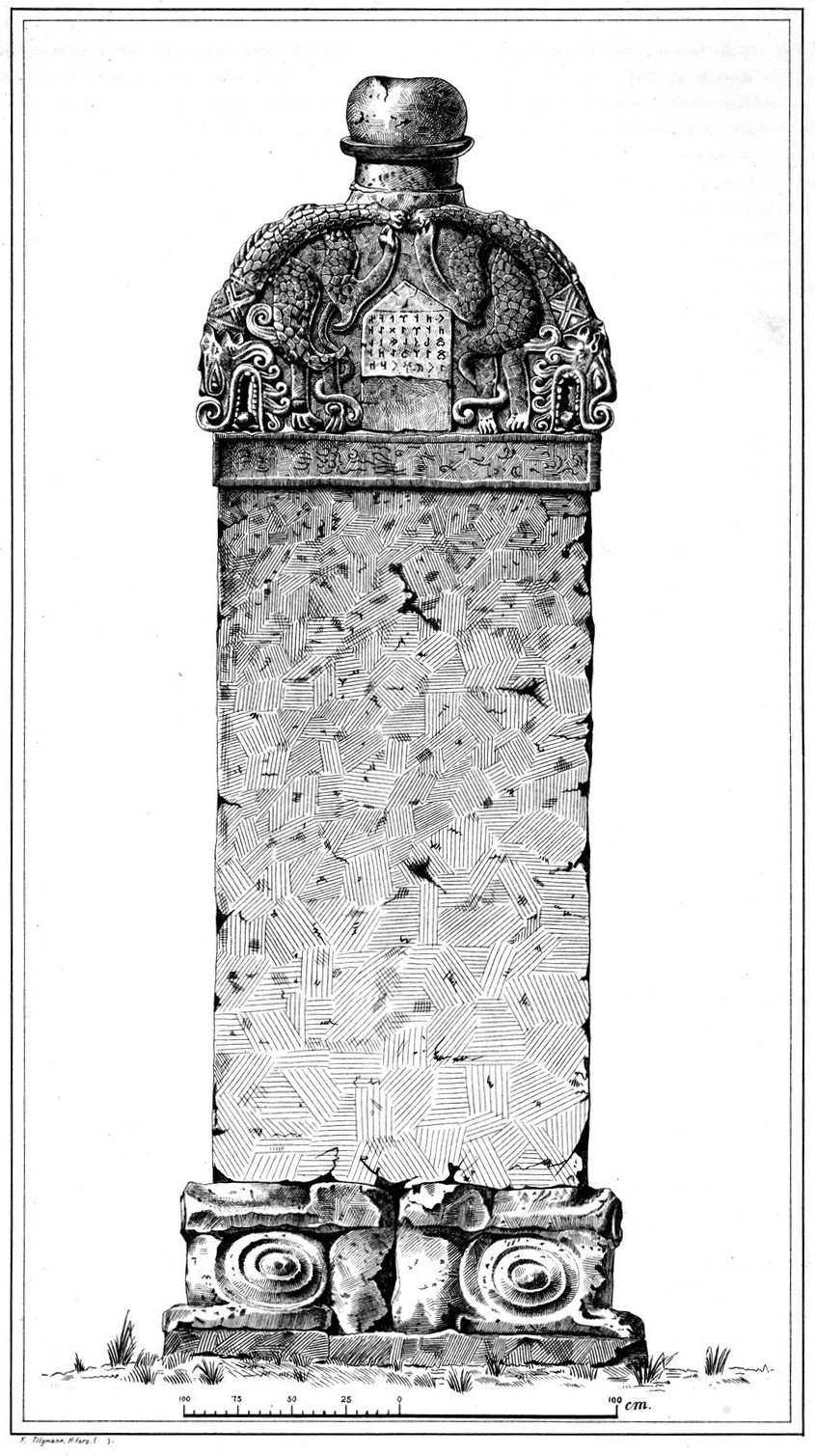
Monument of the 8th Uyghur Khagan Baoyi in Ordubaliq, erected around 821 AD

An ambassador from the Samanid Empire, Tamim ibn Bahr, visited Ordu Baliq in 821 and left the only written account of the city. He traveled through uninhabited steppes until he arrived at the Uyghur capital. He described Ordu-Baliq as a great town, "rich in agriculture and surrounded by rustaqs (villages) full of cultivation lying close together. The town had twelve iron gates of huge size. The town was populous and thickly crowded and had markets and various trades." He reported that amongst the townspeople, Manichaeism prevailed.

The most striking detail of his description is the golden yurt or tent on top of the citadel where the khagan held court.

He says that from (a distance of) five farsakhs before he arrived in the town (of the khaqan) he caught sight of a tent belonging to the king, (made) of gold. (It stands) on the flat top (sath) of his castle and can hold (tasa') 100 men.

— Tamim b. Bahr al-Muttawwi'i, translation by Minorsky

The golden tent was considered the heart of Uyghur power, gold being the symbol of imperial rule. The presence of a golden tent is confirmed in Chinese historical accounts where the Kirghiz khan was said to have vowed to seize the Uyghurs' golden tent.

== Discovery ==
In 1871, the Russian traveler Paderin was the first European to visit the ruins of the Uyghur capital. Only the wall and a tower were in still standing, while the streets and ruins outside the wall could be seen at a distance. He was told that the Mongols call it either Kara Balghasun ("black city") or khara-kherem ("black wall"). Paderin's belief that this was the old Mongol capital Karakorum has been shown to be incorrect.

The site was identified as a ruined Uyghur capital by the expedition of Nikolay Yadrintsev in 1889 and two expeditions of the Finnish Finno-Ugrian Society (1890), followed by that of the Russian Academy of Sciences, under Friedrich Wilhelm Radloff (1891).

== See also ==
- Architecture of Mongolia
- Karabalgasun inscription
- Khara-Khoto
- Por-Bazhyn, a ruined structure on a lake island high in the mountains of southern Tuva, whose lay-out is similar to the palace complex of Karabalgasun
