= Taranchi =

Turkic-speaking people of the Tarim Basin

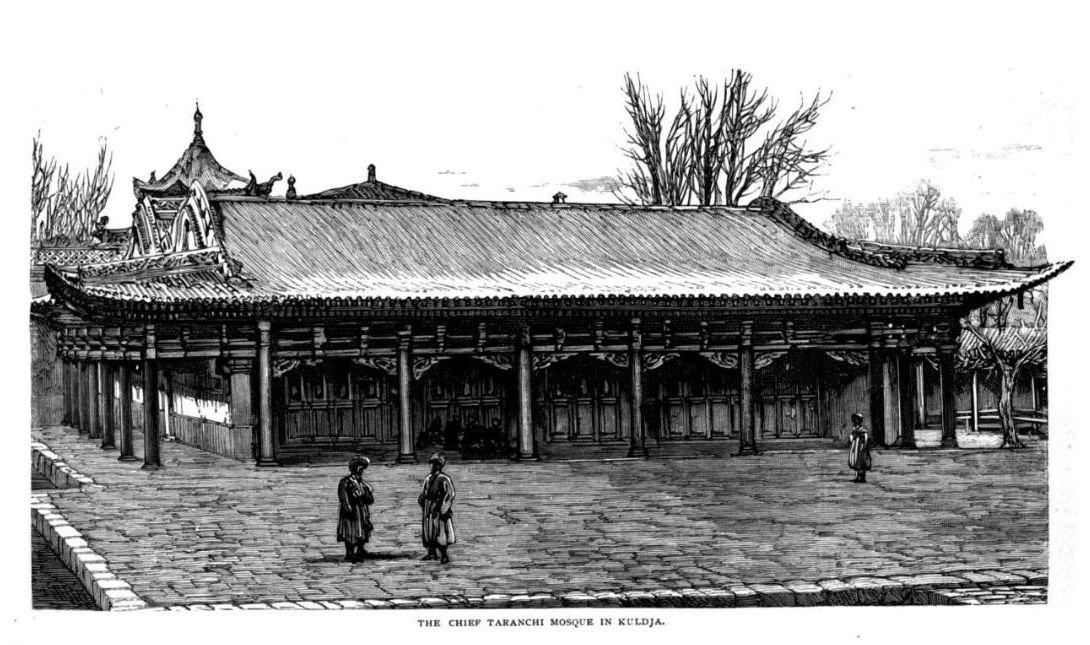
- "The chief Taranchi mosque in Kuldja" (now Yining), from Henry Lansdell's 1885 book describing his visit there in 1882

Uyghur name
- Uyghur: تارانچى
Transcriptions
- Latin Yëziqi: Taranchi
- Yengi Yeziⱪ: Taranqi
- Siril Yëziqi: Тaрaнчи

Chinese name
- Traditional Chinese: 塔蘭奇
- Simplified Chinese: 塔兰奇
Transcriptions
Standard Mandarin
- Hanyu Pinyin: Tǎlánqí
- Wade–Giles: T'a^{3}-lan^{2}-ch'i^{2}

Taranchi is a term denoting the Turkic-speaking, Muslim, sedentary population living in oases around the Tarim Basin in today's Xinjiang, China, whose native language is one of the Karluk languages and whose ancestral heritages include Tocharians, Iranic peoples such as Sakas and Sogdians, and the later Turkic peoples such as the Uyghurs, Karluks, Yaghmas, Chigils, Basmyls, Tuhsis and lastly, the Mongolic tribes of the Chagatai Khanate.

== Name ==
The same name – which simply means 'a farmer' in Chagatai – can be extended to agrarian populations of the Ferghana Valley and oases of the entire Central Asian Turkestan. Although the Tarim Basin (with such oases as Kashgar, Kumul, Khotan and Turpan) is the agrarian Taranchis' traditional homeland, they have during the Qing period on China, migrated to regions that are now Urumqi and Ili. Many Taranchis were encouraged to settle in the Ili valley alongside sedentary Xibe garrisons and the nomadic Kyrgyz by the Qing military governors after the conquest of the Dzungars by the Chinese. In the multiethnic Muslim culture of Xinjiang, the term Taranchi is considered contradistinctive to Sart, which denotes towns dwelling traders and craftsmen. It of course excluded the ruling classes of the oases Muslim states, often called Moghol/Mughal because of the Chagatay-Timurid dynasties or Dolan because of the Doglat nobility. However, from a modern perspective, Taranchi, Sart and Moghol Dolans cannot be considered three distinctive ethnic groups, but rather three different classes or castes in the same cultural-linguistic zone that was Chagatay-Timurid.

In the early 20th century, the geopolitical Great Game between Russia and Great Britain resulted in the division of Central Asia among modern nation-states. All oases farmers native to Xinjiang became part of Uyghur nationality by 1934. While most Sarts of oases or Ili Valley towns became part of the Uyghur nationality, those with particularly strong ties to regions west of Xinjiang became Uzbeks. Sometimes such divisions are very arbitrary, because Kashgaris can be as distinctive from Turpanliks as they are from Andijanliks.

== History ==
The Turkic Muslim sedentary people of the Tarim Basin were originally ruled by the Chagatai Khanate while the nomadic Buddhist Oirat Mongol in Dzungaria ruled over the Dzungar Khanate. The Naqshbandi Sufi Khojas, descendants of the Prophet Muhammad, had replaced the Chagatayid Khans as the ruling authority of the Tarim Basin in the early 17th century. There was a struggle between two factions of Khojas, the Afaqi (White Mountain) faction and the Ishaqi (Black Mountain) faction. The Ishaqi defeated the Afaqi, which resulted in the Afaq Khoja inviting the 5th Dalai Lama, the leader of the Tibetan Buddhists, to intervene on his behalf in 1677. The 5th Dalai Lama then called upon his Dzungar Buddhist followers in the Zunghar Khanate to act on this invitation. The Dzungar Khanate then conquered the Tarim Basin in 1680, setting up the Afaqi Khoja as their puppet ruler.

Khoja Afaq asked the 5th Dalai Lama when he fled to Lhasa to help his Afaqi faction take control of the Tarim Basin (Kashgaria). The Dzungar leader Galdan was then asked by the Dalai Lama to restore Khoja Afaq as ruler of Kashgararia. Khoja Afaq collaborated with Galdan's Dzungars when the Dzungars conquered the Tarim Basin from 1678-1680 and set up the Afaqi Khojas as puppet client rulers. The Dalai Lama blessed Galdan's conquest of the Tarim Basin and Turfan Basin.

67,000 patman of grain (each patman is 4 piculs and 5 pecks, or roughly 4,800 kg + 44 litres of dry rice) and 48,000 silver ounces were required to be paid yearly by Kashgar to the Dzungars, and the rest of the cities were also taxed. Trade, milling, and distilling taxes, corvée labor, saffron, cotton, and grain were also extracted by the Dzungars from the Tarim Basin. Every harvest season, women and food had to be provided to Dzungars when they came to extract the taxes from them.

When the Dzungars levied the traditional nomadic Alban poll tax upon the Muslims of Altishahr, the Muslims viewed it as the payment of jizyah (a tax traditionally taken from non-Muslims by Muslim conquerors).

=== Involvement of Qing dynasty China ===
The Turkic Muslims of the Turfan and Kumul Oases then submitted to the Qing dynasty of China, and asked China to free them from the Dzungars. The Qing accepted the rulers of Turfan and Kumul as Qing vassals. The Qing dynasty waged war against the Dzungars for decades until finally defeating them and then Qing Manchu Bannermen carried out the Zunghar genocide, nearly wiping them from existence and depopulating Dzungaria. The Qing then freed the Afaqi Khoja leader Burhan-ud-din and his brother Khoja Jihan from their imprisonment by the Dzungars, and appointed them to rule as Qing vassals over the Tarim Basin. The Khoja brothers decided to renege on this deal and declare themselves as independent leaders of the Tarim Basin. The Qing and the Turfan leader Emin Khoja crushed their revolt and China then took full control of both Dzungaria and the Tarim Basin by 1759.

Some Taranchis resettled to Dzungaria.

Taranchi was the name for Turki agriculturalists who were resettled in Dzungaria from the Tarim Basin oases ("East Turkestani cities") by the Qin dynasty, along with Manchus, Xibo (Xibe), Solons, Han and other ethnic groups. The Manchu Qing policy of settling Chinese colonists and Taranchis from the Tarim Basin on the former Dzungar land was described as having the land "swarmed" with the settlers. The amount of Uyghurs moved by the Qing from Altä-shähär (Tarim Basin) to depopulated Zunghar land in Ili numbered around 10,000 families. The amount of Uyghurs moved by the Qing into Jungharia (Dzungaria) at this time has been described as "large". The Qing settled in Dzungaria even more Turki-Taranchi (Uyghurs) numbering around 12,000 families originating from Kashgar in the aftermath of the Jahangir Khoja invasion in the 1820s. Standard Uyghur is based on the Taranchi dialect, which was chosen by the Chinese government for this role. Salar migrants from Amdo (Qinghai) came to settle the region as religious exiles, migrants, and as soldiers enlisted in the Chinese army to fight in Ili, often following the Hui.

The Taranchi revolted against the Qing dynasty during the Dungan revolt. At first, they cooperated with the Dungans, but turned on them, massacring the Dungans at Kuldja and driving the rest through Talk pass to the Ili valley.

== Bibliography ==
- Andreyev, Alexandre (2003). Soviet Russia and Tibet: The Debacle of Secret Diplomacy, 1918-1930s (illustrated ed.). BRILL. ISBN 9004129529.
- Andreyev, Alexandre (2014). The Myth of the Masters Revived: The Occult Lives of Nikolai and Elena Roerich. BRILL. ISBN 978-9004270435.
- Baabar (1999). Kaplonski, Christopher (ed.). Twentieth Century Mongolia. Vol. 1 (illustrated ed.). White Horse Press. ISBN 1874267405.
- Baabar, Bat-Ėrdėniĭn Baabar (1999). Kaplonski, Christopher (ed.). History of Mongolia (illustrated, reprint ed.). Monsudar Pub. ISBN 9992900385.
- The Encyclopædia Britannica: A Dictionary of Arts, Sciences, and General Literature. Vol. 23 (9 ed.). Maxwell Sommerville. 1894.
- Harvard Asia Quarterly. Vol. 9. Harvard Asia Law Society, Harvard Asia Business Club, and Asia at the Graduate School of Design. 2005.
- Linguistic Typology. Vol. 2. Mouton de Gruyter. 1998.
- Journal of the North-China Branch of the Royal Asiatic Society. Vol. 10. Shanghai: The Branch. 1876.
- Royal Asiatic Society of Great Britain and Ireland. North China Branch, Shanghai (1876). Journal of the North China Branch of the Royal Asiatic Society. Vol. 10. Shanghai: Kelly & Walsh.
- Great Britain. Parliament. House of Commons (1871). Parliamentary Papers, House of Commons and Command. Vol. 51. H.M. Stationery Office.
- Papers by Command. Vol. 101. H.M. Stationery Office. 1914.
- Great Britain. Foreign Office. Historical Section, George Walter Prothero (1920). Handbooks Prepared Under the Direction of the Historical Section of the Foreign Office, Issues 67-74. H.M. Stationery Office.
- Great Britain. Foreign Office. Historical Section (1973). George Walter Prothero (ed.). China, Japan, Siam. Scholarly Resources, Incorporated. ISBN 0842017046.
- Ethnological information on China. Vol. 16. CCM Information Corporation. c. 1960.
- Bellér-Hann, Ildikó, ed. (2007). Situating the Uyghurs Between China and Central Asia (illustrated ed.). Ashgate Publishing, Ltd. ISBN 978-0754670414. ISSN 1759-5290.
- Bretschneider, E. (1876). Notices of the Mediæval Geography and History of Central and Western Asia. Trübner & Company.
- Bridgman, Elijah Coleman; Williams, Samuel Wells (1837). The Chinese Repository (reprint ed.). Maruzen Kabushiki Kaisha.
- The Chinese Repository. Vol. 5 (reprint ed.). Kraus Reprint. 1837.
- Britannica Educational Publishing (2010). Pletcher, Kenneth (ed.). The Geography of China: Sacred and Historic Places. Britannica Educational Publishing. ISBN 978-1615301829.
- Britannica Educational Publishing (2011). Pletcher, Kenneth (ed.). The Geography of China: Sacred and Historic Places (illustrated ed.). The Rosen Publishing Group. ISBN 978-1615301348.
- Victor C. Falkenheim. "Xinjiang - Britannica Online Encyclopedia". Britannica.com. p. 2.
- Benson, Linda; Svanberg, Ingvar C. (1998). China's Last Nomads: The History and Culture of China's Kazaks (illustrated ed.). M.E. Sharpe. ISBN 1563247828.
- Clarke, Michael E. (2011). Xinjiang and China's Rise in Central Asia - A History. Taylor & Francis. ISBN 978-1136827068.
- Clarke, Michael Edmund (2004). In the Eye of Power: China and Xinjiang from the Qing Conquest to the 'New Great Game' for Central Asia, 1759–2004 (PDF) (Thesis). Griffith University, Brisbane: Dept. of International Business & Asian Studies. Archived from the original (PDF) on 2008-04-10.
- Croner, Don (2009). "1" ( (PDF)). False Lama - The Life and Death of Dambijantsan. Ulaan Baatar: Don Crone. Archived from the original on 3 September 2014.
- Croner, Don (2010). "Ja Lama - The Life and Death of Dambijantsan" (PDF). dambijantsan.doncroner.com. Ulaan Baatar: Don Crone. Archived from the original (PDF) on 11 January 2016.
- Crowe, David M. (2014). War Crimes, Genocide, and Justice: A Global History. Palgrave Macmillan. ISBN 978-1137037015.
- Dunnell, Ruth W.; Elliott, Mark C.; Foret, Philippe; Millward, James A (2004). New Qing Imperial History: The Making of Inner Asian Empire at Qing Chengde. Routledge. ISBN 1134362226.
- Debata, Mahesh Ranjan (2007). China's Minorities: Ethnic-religious Separatism in Xinjiang. Central Asian Studies Programme (illustrated ed.). Pentagon Press. ISBN 978-8182743250.
- Dupree, Louis; Naby, Eden; Endicott-West, Elizabeth (1994). Black, Cyril E. (ed.). The Modernization of Inner Asia (reprint ed.). M.E. Sharpe. ISBN 0873327799.
- Dwyer, Arienne M. (2007). Salar: A Study in Inner Asian Language Contact Processes, Part 1 (illustrated ed.). Otto Harrassowitz Verlag. ISBN 978-3447040914.
- Elliott, Mark C. (2001). The Manchu Way: The Eight Banners and Ethnic Identity in Late Imperial China (illustrated, reprint ed.). Stanford University Press. ISBN 0804746842.
- Fairbank, John K., ed. (1978). The Cambridge History of China: Volume 10, Late Ch'ing 1800-1911, Part 1. Cambridge University Press. ISBN 0521214475.
- Fisher, Richard Swainson (1852). The book of the world. Vol. 2. J. H. Colton.
- Forbes, Andrew D. W. (1986). Warlords and Muslims in Chinese Central Asia: A Political History of Republican Sinkiang 1911-1949 (illustrated ed.). CUP Archive. ISBN 0521255147.
- Garnaut, Anthony (2008). "From Yunnan to Xinjiang : Governor Yang Zengxin and his Dungan Generals" (PDF). Études Orientales (25). Archived from the original (PDF) on 2012-03-09.
- Gernet, Jacques (1996). A History of Chinese Civilization (illustrated, reprint, revised ed.). Cambridge University Press. ISBN 0521497817.
- Gorelova, Liliya M., ed. (2002). Handbook of Oriental Studies. Section 8 Uralic & Central Asian Studies, Manchu Grammar. Vol. Seven. Brill Academic Pub. ISBN 9004123075.
- Guo, Baogang; Hickey, Dennis V., eds. (2009). Toward Better Governance in China: An Unconventional Pathway of Political Reform (illustrated ed.). Lexington Books. ISBN 978-0739140291.
- Guo, Sujian; Guo, Baogang (2007). Guo, Sujian; Guo, Baogang (eds.). Challenges facing Chinese political development (illustrated ed.). Lexington Books. ISBN 978-0739120941.
- Harris, Rachel (2004). Singing the Village: Music, Memory and Ritual Among the Sibe of Xinjiang (illustrated ed.). Oxford University Press. ISBN 019726297X.
- Howell, Anthony J. (2009). Population Migration and Labor Market Segmentation: Empirical Evidence from Xinjiang, Northwest China. Michigan State University. Michigan State University. Geography. ISBN 978-1109243239.
- Islamic Culture. Vol. 27–29. Islamic Culture Board. Deccan. 1971. ISBN 0842017046.
- Juntunen, Mirja; Schlyter, Birgit N., eds. (2013). Return To The Silk Routes (illustrated ed.). Routledge. ISBN 978-1136175190.
- Kim, Hodong (2004). Holy War in China: The Muslim Rebellion and State in Chinese Central Asia, 1864-1877 (illustrated ed.). Stanford University Press. ISBN 0804767238.
- Kim, Kwangmin (2008). Saintly Brokers: Uyghur Muslims, Trade, and the Making of Qing Central Asia, 1696--1814. University of California, Berkeley. ISBN 978-1109101263. Archived from the original on 4 December 2016.
- Lattimore, Owen; Nachukdorji, Sh (1955). Nationalism and Revolution in Mongolia. Brill Archive.
- Lin, Hsiao-ting (2007). "Nationalists, Muslims Warlords, and the "Great Northwestern Development" in Pre-Communist China" (PDF). China and Eurasia Forum Quarterly. 5 (1). Central Asia-Caucasus Institute and Silk Road Studies Program. ISSN 1653-4212. Archived from the original (PDF) on 2010-09-23.
- Lattimore, Owen (1950). Pivot of Asia; Sinkiang and the inner Asian frontiers of China and Russia. Little, Brown.
- Levene, Mark (2008). "Empires, Native Peoples, and Genocides". In Moses, A. Dirk (ed.). Empire, Colony, Genocide: Conquest, Occupation, and Subaltern Resistance in World History. Oxford and New York: Berghahn. pp. 183–204. ISBN 978-1-84545-452-4.
- Lipman, Jonathan Neaman (1998). Familiar strangers: a history of Muslims in Northwest China. University of Washington Press. ISBN 0295800550.
- Liu, Tao Tao; Faure, David (1996). Unity and Diversity: Local Cultures and Identities in China. Hong Kong University Press. ISBN 9622094023.
- Lorge, Peter (2006). War, Politics and Society in Early Modern China, 900–1795. Routledge. ISBN 1134372868.
- Marks, Robert B. (2011). China: Its Environment and History. Rowman & Littlefield Publishers. ISBN 978-1442212770.
- Martin, Robert Montgomery (1847). China; Political, Commercial, and Social: In an Official Report to Her Majesty's Government. J. Madden.
- Martyn, Norma (1987). The silk road. Methuen. ISBN 9780454008364.
- Mentelle, Edme; Malte Conrad Brun (dit Conrad) Malte-Brun; Pierre-Etienne Herbin de Halle (1804). Géographie mathématique, physique & politique de toutes les parties du monde. Vol. 12. H. Tardieu.
- Millward, James A. (1998). Beyond the Pass: Economy, Ethnicity, and Empire in Qing Central Asia, 1759-1864 (illustrated ed.). Stanford University Press. ISBN 0804729336.
- Millward, James A. (2007). Eurasian Crossroads: A History of Xinjiang (illustrated ed.). Columbia University Press. ISBN 978-0231139243.
- Morozova, Irina Y. (2009). Socialist Revolutions in Asia: The Social History of Mongolia in the 20th Century. Routledge. ISBN 978-1135784379.
- Myer, Will (2003). Islam and Colonialism Western Perspectives on Soviet Asia. Routledge. ISBN 113578583X.
- Nan, Susan Allen; Mampilly, Zachariah Cherian; Bartoli, Andrea, eds. (2011). Peacemaking: From Practice to Theory [2 volumes]: From Practice to Theory. ABC-CLIO. ISBN 978-0313375774.
- Nan, Susan Allen; Mampilly, Zachariah Cherian; Bartoli, Andrea, eds. (2011). Peacemaking: From Practice to Theory. Vol. One. ABC-CLIO. ISBN 978-0313375767.
- Newby, L. J. (2005). The Empire And the Khanate: A Political History of Qing Relations With Khoqand C.1760-1860 (illustrated ed.). BRILL. ISBN 9004145508.
- Nyman, Lars-Erik (1977). Great Britain and Chinese, Russian and Japanese interests in Sinkiang, 1918-1934. Esselte studium. ISBN 9124272876.
- Paine, S. C. M. (1996). Imperial Rivals: China, Russia, and Their Disputed Frontier (illustrated ed.). M.E. Sharpe. ISBN 1563247240.
- Palmer, James (2011). The Bloody White Baron: The Extraordinary Story of the Russian Nobleman Who Became the Last Khan of Mongolia (reprint ed.). Basic Books. ISBN 978-0465022076.
- Parker, Charles H. (2010). Global Interactions in the Early Modern Age, 1400–1800. Cambridge University Press. ISBN 978-1139491419.
- Pegg, Carole (2001). Mongolian Music, Dance, & Oral Narrative: Performing Diverse Identities. Vol. 1 (illustrated ed.). University of Washington Press. ISBN 0295980303.
- Perdue, Peter C (2005). China Marches West: The Qing Conquest of Central Eurasia (illustrated ed.). Harvard University Press. ISBN 067401684X.
- Perdue, Peter C (2009). China Marches West: The Qing Conquest of Central Eurasia (reprint ed.). Harvard University Press. ISBN 978-0674042025.
- Perdue, Peter C. (October 1996). "Military Mobilization in Seventeenth and Eighteenth-Century China, Russia, and Mongolia". Modern Asian Studies. 30 (4 Special Issue: War in Modern China). Cambridge University Press: 757–793. doi:10.1017/s0026749x00016796. JSTOR 312949. S2CID 146587527.
- Pollard, Vincent, ed. (2011). State Capitalism, Contentious Politics and Large-Scale Social Change (illustrated ed.). BRILL. ISBN 978-9004194458.
- Powers, John; Templeman, David (2012). Historical Dictionary of Tibet (illustrated ed.). Scarecrow Press. ISBN 978-0810879843.
- Prakash, Buddha (1963). The modern approach to history. University Publishers.
- Rahul, Ram (2000). March of Central Asia. Indus Publishing. ISBN 8173871094.
- Reed, J. Todd; Raschke, Diana (2010). The ETIM: China's Islamic Militants and the Global Terrorist Threat. ABC-CLIO. ISBN 978-0313365409.
- Roberts, John A.G. (2011). A History of China (revised ed.). Palgrave Macmillan. ISBN 978-0230344112. Archived from the original on 29 April 2016.
- Rudelson, Justin Jon; Rudelson, Justin Ben-Adam (1992). Bones in the Sand: The Struggle to Create Uighur Nationalist Ideologies in Xinjiang, China (reprint ed.). Harvard University.
- Rudelson, Justin Jon; Rudelson, Justin Ben-Adam (1997). Oasis Identities: Uyghur Nationalism Along China's Silk Road (illustrated ed.). Columbia University Press. ISBN 0231107862.
- M. Romanovski, ed. (1870). "Eastern Turkestan and Dzungaria, and the rebellion of the Tungans and Taranchis, 1862 to 1866 by Robert Michell". Notes on the Central Asiatic Question. Calcutta: Office of Superintendent of Government Printing.
- Sanders, Alan J. K. (2010). Historical Dictionary of Mongolia (3, illustrated ed.). Scarecrow Press. ISBN 978-0810874527.
- Shelton, Dinah C (2005). Shelton, Dinah (ed.). Encyclopedia of genocide and crimes against humanity. Vol. 3 (illustrated ed.). Macmillan Reference. ISBN 0028658507.
- Sinor, Denis, ed. (1990). Aspects of Altaic Civilization III: Proceedings of the Thirtieth Meeting of the Permanent International Altaistic Conference, Indiana University, Bloomington, Indiana, June 19-25, 1987. Indiana University, Bloomington. Research Institute for Inner Asian Studies. Psychology Press. ISBN 0700703802.
- Fan, Sidong (1999). "Forward". New Ghosts, Old Ghosts: Prisons and Labor Reform Camps in China. By Seymour, James D.; Anderson, Richard. Socialism and Social Movements Series (illustrated, reprint ed.). M.E. Sharpe. ISBN 0765605104.
- Starr, S. Frederick, ed. (2004). Xinjiang: China's Muslim Borderland (illustrated ed.). M.E. Sharpe. ISBN 0765613182.
- Tamm, Eric (2013). The Horse that Leaps Through Clouds: A Tale of Espionage, the Silk Road, and the Rise of Modern China. Counterpoint. ISBN 978-1582438764. Archived from the original on 1 August 2020.
- Theobald, Ulrich (2013). War Finance and Logistics in Late Imperial China: A Study of the Second Jinchuan Campaign (1771–1776). BRILL. ISBN 978-9004255678.
- Tyler, Christian (2004). Wild West China: The Taming of Xinjiang (illustrated, reprint ed.). Rutgers University Press. ISBN 0813535336.
- Universität Bonn. Ostasiatische Seminar (1982). Asiatische Forschungen. Vol. 73–75. O. Harrassowitz. ISBN 344702237X.
- Walcott, Susan M.; Johnson, Corey, eds. (2013). Eurasian Corridors of Interconnection: From the South China to the Caspian Sea. Routledge. ISBN 978-1135078751.
- Westad, Odd Arne (2012). Restless Empire: China and the World Since 1750 (illustrated ed.). Basic Books. ISBN 978-0465029365.
- Wong, John; Zheng, Yongnian, eds. (2002). China's Post-Jiang Leadership Succession: Problems and Perspectives. World Scientific. ISBN 981270650X.
- Zhao, Gang (January 2006). "Reinventing China Imperial Qing Ideology and the Rise of Modern Chinese National Identity in the Early Twentieth Century". Modern China. 32 (1). Sage Publications: 3–30. doi:10.1177/0097700405282349. JSTOR 20062627. S2CID 144587815.
- Znamenski, Andrei (2011). Red Shambhala: Magic, Prophecy, and Geopolitics in the Heart of Asia (illustrated ed.). Quest Books. ISBN 978-0835608916.
- The Mongolia Society Bulletin. Vol. 9. Mongolia Society. 1970.
- Mongolia Society Bulletin. Vol. 9–12. Mongolia Society. 1970.
- France. Comité des travaux historiques et scientifiques. Section de géographie (1895). Bulletin de la Section de géographie. Vol. 10. PARIS: IMPRIMERIE NATIONALE.
- Inner Asia. Vol. 4. The White Horse Press for the Mongolia and Inner Asia Studies Unit at the University of Cambridge. 2002. ISBN 0804729336.
