= Bulaqs =

Turkic tribe

The Bulaqs (Note: Also called Bulaks, Blaks, Blaqs, Blacs, Blachs, and Blaci, Blacki, Blachi, Balachi, Blasi, Iliac, Ivlach, Ivlat, Aulâq, etc.) were a Turkic tribe known mainly from Arabic sources, originating from the Lop Nor region. They were a core part of the Karluk confederacy located in the Altai Mountains. Many of them migrated to the Southern Ural, into the neighbourhood of the Volga Bulgars and Magna Hungaria Hungarians. Eventually, they were conquered by the Tsardom of Russia in the late 16th century, whom their last record is from.

According to some Hungarian scholars, many of them settled in the Balkans and the Carpathian Basin with the Bulgars, another Turkic nation. Certain medieval writers, most notably Anonymus, Simon of Kéza and William of Rubruck wrote about a people of this name.

== Etymology ==
According to the dictionary of Mahmud al-Kashgari, their name, Bulaq, means "broad-backed horse"

Károly Czeglédy and Lajos Ligeti deciphered the ethnonym from the Chinese sources (Old Chinese miə̯u-lâk Middle Chinese bu-lâk>Arabic bulaq) as mou-lo 謀落 or mou-la 謀剌. Omeljan Pritsak came to the same conclusion without referring to the previous scholar's works. As already Gyula Németh noted, the mi̯əu-lôk or miə̯u-lâk ~ bulaq is etymologically related to the colour of horses which was a usual tribal designation on the steppe.

Dezső Pais states that the name originates from the Turkic balxu, (bal ("slice")+-ku or -xu suffix) meaning "branch" or "part". This was adopted by the Slavs as blach (singular) and blasi (plural). Turkologist László Rásonyi dismisses this claim and notes that Bulaq meant "white-piebald" horse in some Turkic languages and in Mongolian, while in Chagatai, "white-legged horse".

== History ==
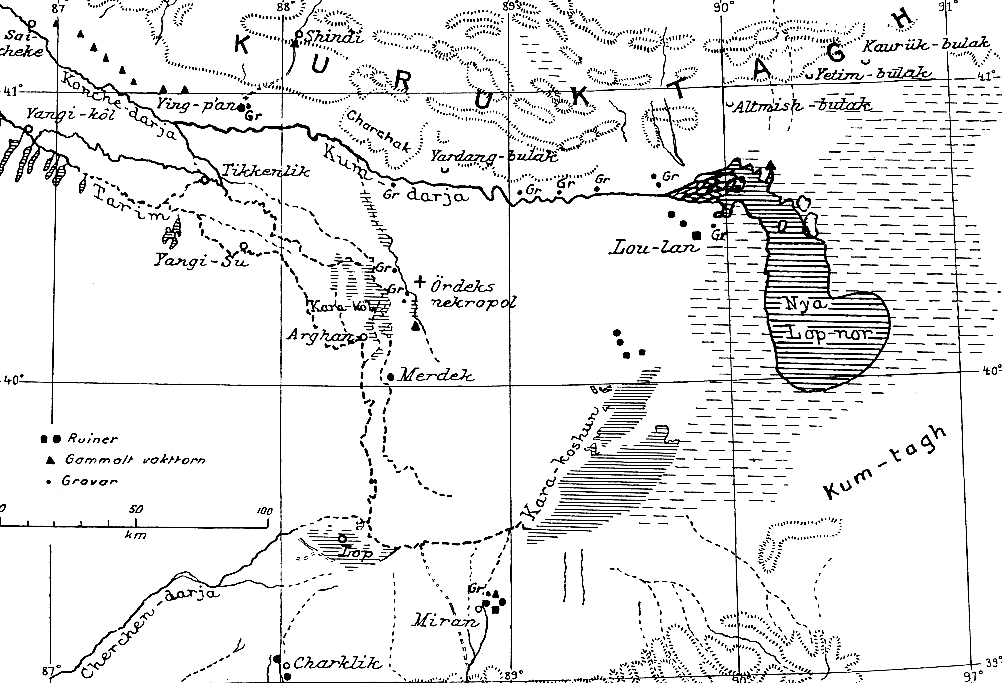
Map of the Lop Nor region by Folke Bergman

The people formed in the Lop Nor region, from where they migrated away around year zero due to desertification. The Chinese and Arab manuscripts mentioned the tribal names of the Karluks. According to the Chinese sources, the Bulaqs were one of the three core tribes of the Karluk confederation who lived in the Altai Mountains and were among the Western Turkic troops who were defeated in the Tang campaigns against the Western Turks in 650. In 657 CE, the Tang dynasty set up a Yinshan dudufu (district/prefecture; Yinshan mean "the dark mountain", Ildikó Ecsedy considers northern slopes of Tarbagatai Mountains) for the Bulaqs. The other two tribes also received separate prefectures with their chiefs appointed as governors. Between 690s and 718 the three tribes allied themselves with the Göktürks (Second Turkic Khaganate) or Tang dynasty, while in 718 were conquered by Bilge Khagan and the Tang-aligned chiefs were replaced. Between mid-6th and mid-7th century the Karluk tribes migrated between Mongolian plateau, Altai, and regions south and west, depending on the political-diplomatic orientations of the Karluk yabgu. By 766 they were in possession of the cities of Suyab and Talas (in Arabic record: T. w. l. s., in Chinese: To-lo-se) around which formed Karluk yabghu (756–940) and Kara-Khanid Khanate (840–1212).

The later Arabic sources, like Sharaf al-Zaman al-Marwazi depicted a union of nine tribes, including the Bulaq (bdw, bwâwî), Hudud al-'Alam noted that the blâq were one of the Yagma constituent components, "mixed with the Toquz Oghuz", while Al-Kashgari in his 11th century work Dīwān Lughāt al-Turk among the listed Turkic tribes mentioned Bulaq and Elke/Älkä Bulaq. According to him, the Bulaqs became captives of the Kipchaks, but later regained their independence and thus came to be called with the former name. According to Rásonyi the name should be spelled as Ärkä Bulaq.

According to Lajos Tardy the name Ivlach and Ivlat, mentioned by Archbishop Johannes de Galonifontibus in 1404, refers to William of Rubruck's account, which István Ferenczi related to the Bulaqs. Ferenczi argued that the records of slave sales from Kaffa also suggest that the word "Ivlach" denotes the Bulaqs, as well the Aulâq people, mentioned by Abu al-Ghazi Bahadur with the Russians, Hungarians and Bashkirs. The cartographers Johannes Schöner (1523) and Pierre Desceliers (1553) located the Blaci people north of the Caspian Sea. Rásonyi located Magna Blacia, Magna Bulgaria and Magna Hungaria as neighboring Bashkiria, based on missionaries' works from the Middle Ages. The Bulaqs are mentioned for the last time shortly after their conquest by the Russians in 1592. They lived in modern-day Tomsk Oblast, east of the Bashkirs and the Urals.

== Confusion with Vlachs ==
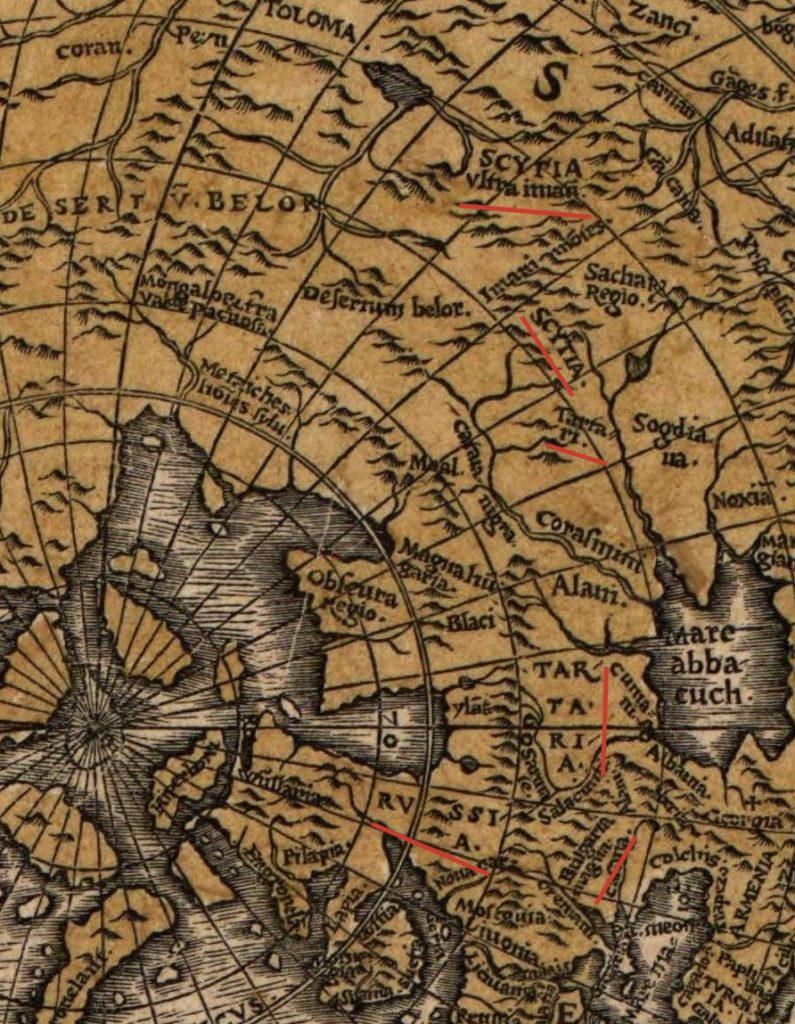
The "Blaci " people next to Magna Hungaria depicted on Oroncé Finé's world map Nova Universi Orbis Descriptio (1531)

According to the accounts of William of Rubruck and Roger Bacon, during the Huns migration to Europe "also came the Blacs, the Bulgars and the Vandals. For from that Greater Bulgaria come the Bulgars, who are beyond the Danube near Constantinople. And near the land of Pascatir (Magna Hungaria i.e. somewhere around the Ural Mountains and the Volga River from where came the Huns) are the Iliac (Blachi from greater Blachia, from which came the Blachi in the land Assani between Constantinople and Bulgaria and lesser Hungary), which is the same word as Blac but the Tatars do not know how to pronounce (the letter) B, and from them come those who are in the land of Assan. They call both of them Iliac, the former and the latter".

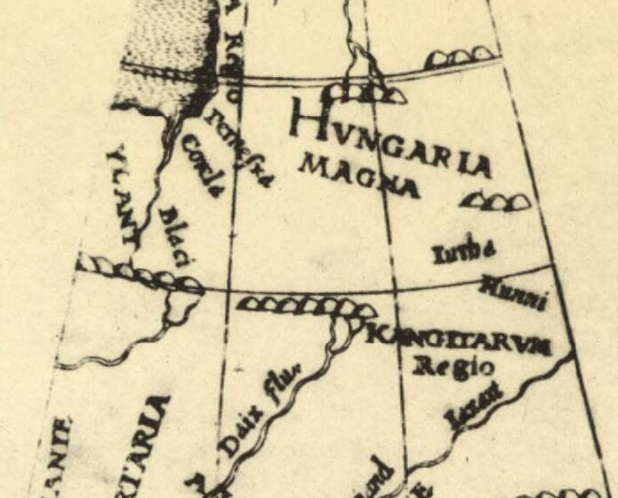
The "Blaci" people next to Magna Hungaria depicted on the Johannes Schöner's terrestrial globe (1523/24)

The remark by Simon of Kéza from his work Gesta Hunnorum et Hungarorum about the Székelys living in the mountains which they shared with the Vlachs, where mingled with them, and adopted their alphabet, sparked a controversy about the Old Hungarian script (Rovás), while other scholars noticed that Simon did distinguish between Ulahis (Vlachs) and Blackis while some scholars identified the Blacki people with the Bulaqs. Moreover, the Old Hungarian script is deemed as related to the Old Turkic script by linguists. Johannes de Thurocz, in his work Chronica Hungarorum called the alphabet of the Székelys "Scythian letters". Prominent Hungarian linguist, Gyula Németh notes in his work A magyar rovásírás that the writings found in the Talas river valley show close similarity.

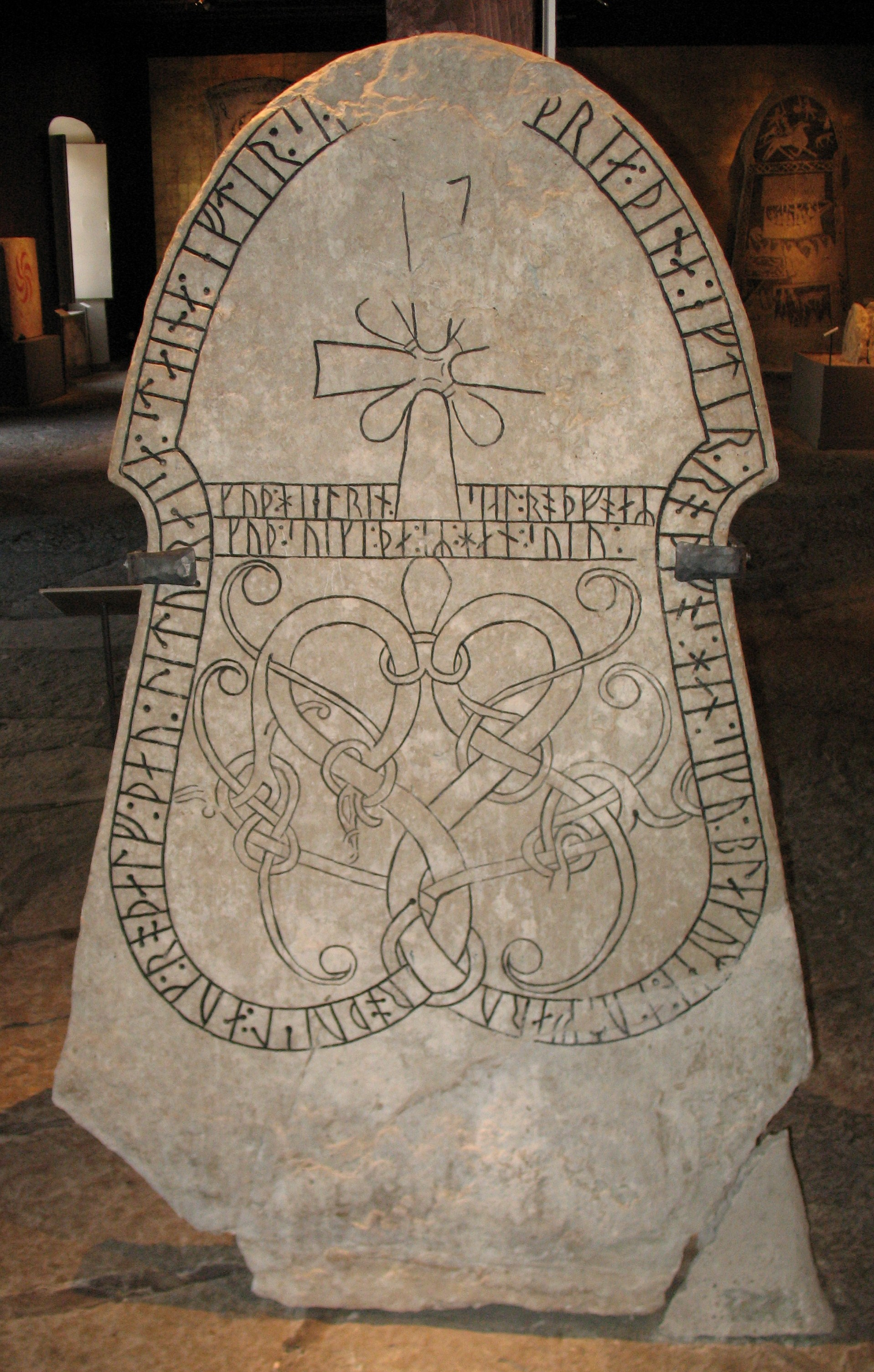
Verengian runestone mentioning the Bulaqs.

A diploma of King Andrew II and a letter of Pope Innocent III, both written in 1222, mention the "land of the Blacs" (Terra Blacorum) between the Olt and the Carpathians. In 1223, another diploma of the king "exempts from the Blacs" (exempta de Blaccis) and gifts part of this land to the Order of the Cictercians. The document provides details of the territory, no toponyms mentioned originate from the Romanian language. Snorri Sturluson, medieval Icelandic historian, writing about the campaign of Alexios I Komnenos against the Pechenegs, mentioned Blokumannaland in 1122. Pritsak identifies this people with the Cumans, while Ervin Láczay believes that Sturluson referred to the "forest of the Blacs and Pechenegs" (silvam Blacorum et Bissenorum), to which the Transylvanian Saxons were given access in 1224. On a Varangian runestone in Gotland, the Blakumen (people) is mentioned.

The first historian to distinguish them was László Réthy (Anonymus az erdélyi oláhokról, 1880). After analyzing dozens of medieval records of Vlachs, (e.g. Anna Komnene who wrote nomadibus, quos Vlachos vulgari lingua vocare solen, "nomads whom common people call Vlachs") he concludes that the Vlach ethonym was used to designate not just the Romanians, but all transhumance populations, including the Bulgarians who he connects Anonymus' blachii and Nestor's Влахом to. Géza Nagy continues his theory, saying that the possible early name of the Bulgarians, alogo ("great", see Alogobotur), was confused by documenters. French sinologist Paul Pelliot also tried to prove that the Illac and Lac recorded by Marco Polo, William of Rubruck and Roger Bacon aren't identical with the Ulac (Vlach).

Anonymus writes about the Blacs "the inhabitants of the land, seeing the death of their lord, giving the right hand of their own free will chose to themselves as lord Tuhutum, father of Horca, and in that place which is called Esculeu, they confirmed their pledge with an oath...". This conforms the Turkic custom, but would've been impossible for the Vlachs.

The archaeological finds confirm the analysis of Transylvanian river names, the Hungarians who settled in Transylvania during the 10th century encountered with a small Turkic group in the southeast, near Küküllő and Olt rivers. László Rásonyi, after protractedly analyzing Transylvanian toponyms and personal names, found the linguistic evidence to prove Bulaq presence there sufficient.

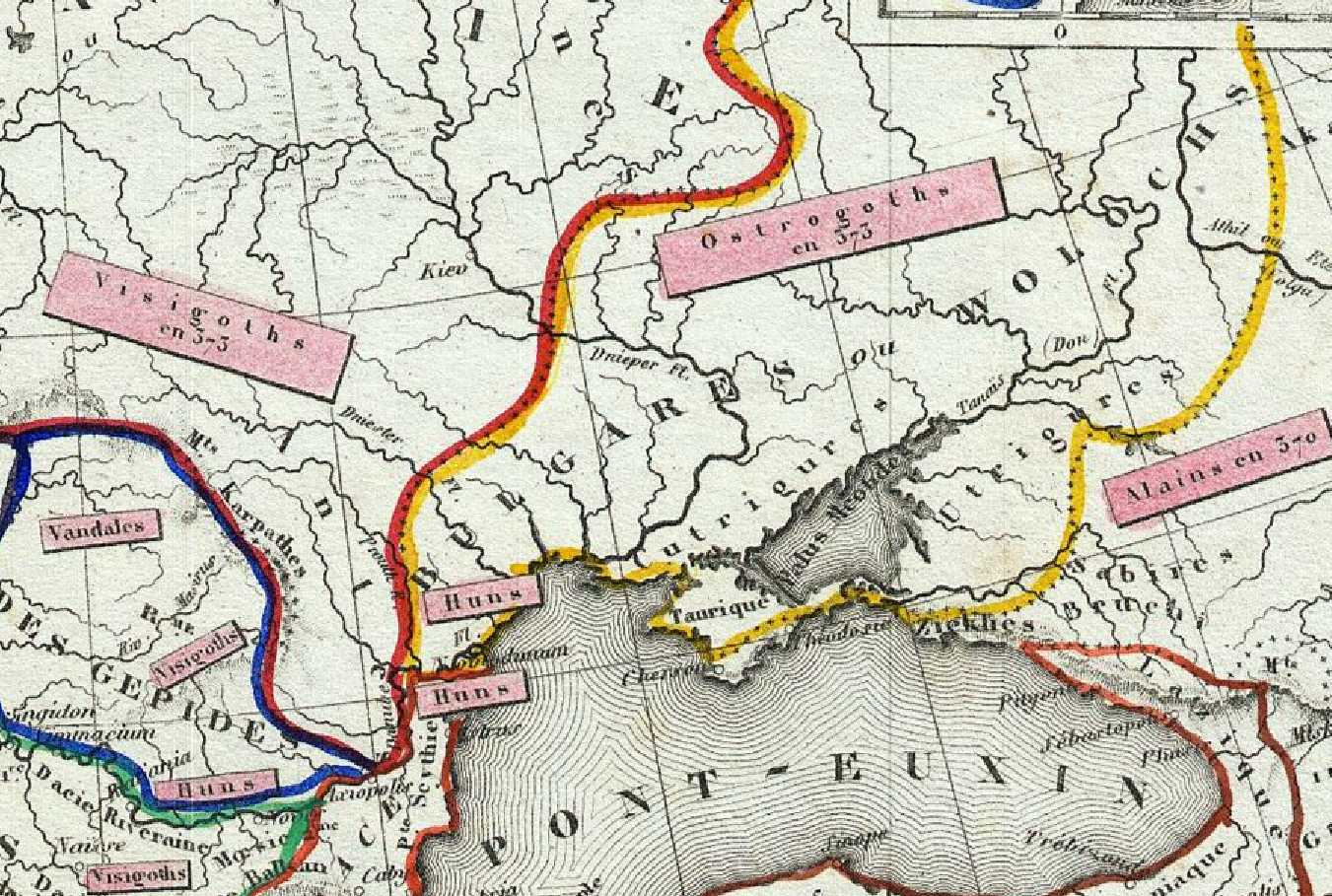
Map made by Auguste Dufour of the late 5th century. The Wolochi people are in the yellow-bordered territory.

Anonymus mentions the Blacs and Bulgars with a conjunction (Bulgarii et Blachii), indicating that they are relatives. The Bulaqs and Bulgars are both Turkic peoples.

György Bodor says that diplomas verify that in 1225 the Transylvanian Bulaqs, along with many other border guarding peoples were annexed by the Székely seats and assimilated.

György Györffy wrote in his work Az Árpád-kori Magyarország Történeti Földrajza. Vol. II. that "regarding the Blak ethnicity, Mongol sources can be brought up to testify that they talk about the Turkic Blak, Ulaq element".

=== Criticism ===
According to Romanian historian Victor Spinei, beside the etymological and historical differences between the terms Blaci and Bulaqs, there is not a single historical or archaeological indication for a possible Bulaqs migration towards the Carpathian-Balkan area. Also, it is impossible to explain how such insignificant population was unassimilated for several centuries far from the place of origin. László Makkai wrote that although "there has been some speculation that Anonymus' Blaks were the Turkic people who are mentioned in medieval sources as bearing the same name and living east of the Carpathians, but this hypothesis does not bear the test of scholarly scrutiny". István Vásáry noted that Rásonyi tried to prove the Blaci of Transylvania were not the Vlachs, but Turkic people Bulaqs who were confused with the Vlachs. He said that "in the case of the term Blaci, we cannot but conclude that it was used to designate the Vlakhs".

== See also ==
- Karluks
- Western Turkic Khaganate
- Karluk yabghu
- Oghuz Yabgu State
- Kara-Khanid Khanate
