= Bogra Khan =

Bogra Khan Ilak was an ethnic Turkish sovereign who reigned in the latter part of the 10th century over Kashgar, Khotan and other countries intervening between Transoxiana and the Chinese frontier. Of the dynasty to which he belonged and the extensive and formidable empire over which they ruled, we derive only occasional glimpses from the Muslim historians, who consider the Turks beyond the sphere of their research until the establishment of the Seljookians in Persia, but these scattered notices have been diligently collected by M. de Guignes who also succeeded in identifying them with the race called Hoei-Kei by the Chinese analysts. The present race had been converted to Islam two reigns before the accession of Bogra Khan whose Moslem name was Shaheb-ed Doulah Horun; and their appearance in Mohammadan history is principally in connection with the frequent wars which they waged with the Sammmani dynasty in Transoxiana and Khorasan who themselves had emerged from the same region.

The above text is a copy of part of the entry by Rose in his New General Biographical Dictionary, 1857

== See also ==
- Yagma
- Karluks § Karakhanid period
