= Chigils =

Extinct Turkic tribe

The Chigil (Chihil, Cihil, or Chiyal) were a Turkic tribe known from the 7th century CE as living around Issyk Kul lake area. They were considered to be descended from the tribe Chuyue, who were of mixed Yueban-Western Turkic origins.

== Etymology ==
Scholars propose different etymologies for the ethnonym Chigil:

- Sinologist Yu. A. Zuev proposes that Chinese historiographers transcribed Chigil as 處月 Chǔyuè (Middle Chinese (ZS): /t͡ɕʰɨʌˣ-ŋʉɐt̚/), which might have been calqued as "abode of the Moon [god]"; whereas 處密 Chǔmì (/t͡ɕʰɨʌˣ-mˠiɪt̚/)) as "abode of the Sun [god]", for Chinese 密 transcribed Middle Iranian theonym Mihr, the all-seeing Zoroastrian deity of covenant, oath, and light, vaguely associated with the Sun. However, citing Gabain's 1931 and 1934 researches, Zuev cautions that neither Turkic-Buddhist texts, nor the Turkic-Manichaean literature and other sources containing information about Turkic Manichaeism, give a genealogical meaning in reference to the invocation of the Sun and Moon (Turk. kün ay). Confusingly, Zuev also compares Chigil to Persian čihil "forty".
- Kamoliddin (2006) proposes that Chigil was an ethnotoponym containing the morpheme -il (Turkic land, country).
- Bisianov (2025) preliminarily suggests that the Chigil was an ethnotoponym meaning "raw clay" (Turk. či gil).
- Alyılmaz (2017) etymologized Čigil as from plural and generalization suffix -GIl affixed onto tribal name Çik (OTrk. 𐰲𐰃𐰚:𐰉𐰆𐰑𐰣 Çik bodun), a people mentioned in Tang Huiyao as 赤 (MC: *t͡ɕʰiᴇk̚) and, in Bilge Qaghan inscription, as allies of the Yenisei Kyrgyz and enemies of Latter Göktürks. Both the Chiks and the Shatuo are mentioned together. apparently as two distinct groups, in the same Tanghuiyao chapter,

However, Atwood (2010), in light of researches by Tenishev (1965) & Saguchi (1986), doubted the common scholarly identification of Chigils with Chuyue, from whom emerged the Shatuo as Chuyue is phonetically closer to Chunghyl, the name of a "bone" among the Yugurs in modern Gansu province.

As for *Čömül (Ar. Jumul جمل), H. W. Bailey derived it from Iranic *čamṛta < čam- "to stride out like a warrior", thus "warrior striders"

== History ==
Hamilton (1962) and Zuev (2002) saw the first reference to the Chigil as 職乙 (Zhiyi), whose Middle Chinese pronunciation was reconstructed by Zuev as tšįək-iət, as a Tiele tribe mentioned in Book of Sui, compiled by Wei Zheng. However, the original manuscript contains no punctuation, so different scholars read and reconstruct the ethonyms differently: for example, 薄落職乙咥 may also be read as Boluozhi and Yidie

According to medieval writers, the city of Chigil was at "a distance of a human voice" from Taraz. An 11th-century story by Mahmud Kashgari proposed a folk etymology of Chigil, which he dated back to the time of the Zu-I-Karnein (Dhu al-Qarnayn: lit. "the One with Two-Horns", i.e. Alexander the Great) in the 4th century BCE:

When the armies of Zu-l-Karnein reached Talas in the Manichean country Argu, a heavy rainstorm formed thick mud. The road became impassable, and angry Zu-l-Karnein exclaimed in Persian: "In chi gil ast?!" – "What is this mud?! We cannot get out of it!" He ordered a building be erected on the spot called Chigil. Turks in the area were called Chigils. Nomadic Turks, who adopted the Chigil type of [long] clothes were also called Chigils, from Djeyhun (Amu Darya) to the Chin (China). ... The nomad Chigil (as well as the Tukhsī) lived near the township of Quyās lying beyond Barsghān and watered by the two Keykān rivers flowing into the Ili ... Another group of the tribe lived in the township of Chigil, near Ṭarāz, and a third one in the villages of the same name near Kāshgar.

Kashghari says that the Oghuz Turks used to call "Chigil" all the Turks between the Oxus and Northern China.

If the Chuyue in Chinese sources were indeed Chigils, then the Shatuo 沙陀, a Chuyue splinter group, were also a splinter group from Chigils. A Shatuo noble, Keyong, was from the Shatuo Dragon tribe, bore the surname Zhuye 朱耶 ~ Zhuxie 朱邪, and later adopted the surname Li of the Tang emperors, first bestowed on Keyong's father Zhuxie Chixin. Keyong's son Li Cunxu would found of the Later Tang dynasty (923–936) in Northern China, elevating the Shatuo to a regnal clan. Among the Shatuo, the dragon cult was predominant. The annals noted that Shatuo prayers "followed the old tradition of the northern custom" near Thunder-mountain, at the Dragon Gate.

Paraphrasing a passage from Sima Guang's Zizhi Tongjian, Zuev states that "Shatuo is originally (or, at root, 本 běn) a Zhuxie tribe"; Zuev further asserts that Zhuxie reflects the Turkic jüz "hundred". The Chigil-Shatuo were Manichaeans, and "hundred" is not always a military team, but also a religious category yüz er "hundred monk men" as is stated, for example, on a number of the Manichaean Yenisei monuments of ancient Turkic writings. Thus yüz er, as opposed to otuz oglan or otuz er, is a category of dominating level.

Chigils and Yagma, and also the Tuhsi, one of the Türgesh tribes, the remains of the Orkhon Turks, united in the Karluk tribal union, and the history of these tribes, at least since the 9th century, is indivisible. The Hudud al-'Ālam, compiled in 982–3 CE, describes the Chigils as members of the Karluk Yabghu state, occupying the Zhetysu territories including regions around Issyk Kul to the north and east of the Karluks. They are described as possessing great riches and that their king "is one of themselves." It is also reported that "Some of them worship the Sun and the stars."

The Chigils were prominent in the Kara-Khanid Khanate, where they formed the main body of the troops. The power in the Karakhanid state was divided between the nobility of two tribal groups, Chigils and Yagma, which in the 9th century formed the nucleus of the Karluk tribal union, besides Mouluo 謀落 / Moula 謀剌 (Bulaq?), Tashili 踏實力 (Tashlyk?) and Suofu 娑匐 (Note: also rendered as Pofu 婆匐 / Posuo 婆娑 in Chinese texts; Ecsedy (1980) contended that 娑 (Suo), not 婆 (Po), was correct) (Sebeğ?) or Chisi 熾俟. Golden (1992) hesitantly identifies the Chisi 熾俟 with Chuyue 處月. Meanwhile, Atwood (20101) identifies Chisi 熾俟 with Zhusi 朱斯, also mentioned in Xiu Tangshu; Atwood does not link Chisi 熾俟 ~ Zhusi 朱斯 to Chuyue 處月, but instead to Zhuxie 朱邪, the original tribal surname of the Shatuo ruling house. This Karluk-speaking Khaganate was divided into two parts, eastern and western, each headed by its own Khagan. The eastern Kagan was the senior Kagan, with his court in Kashgar and Balasagun (Buran fortress, near Tokmak in Kyrgyzstan). He was from the Chigil tribe and had the title Arslan Kara-Hakan. The western was the lesser Kagan, from the Yagma tribe, with the title Bogra Kara-Kagan and his court in Taraz, and later in Samarkand.

In the eleventh century the Chigils became independent. Kashgari writes that they consisted of three branches.

After the Mongol invasion of Turkestan, the Turks in northern Turkestan and in the Tien Shan region, among them the Chigils, Yagma, Karluks, Argu and Tuhsi, had to give up their territory to the eastern nomadic groups. They migrated to Transoxania and Kashgharia.

There are presently four villages in Turkey called Chigil, indicating that some Chigils migrated to Asia Minor after the Mongol invasion.

== Religion ==
The Chigil were known for their religious dedication. The first depictions of the Chigils describe them as adherents of Manichaeism. Later sources describe the Chigils as Nestorian Christians. The Zhetysu area, a former Chigil territory, is rich with Christian and pre-Christian archaeological remains, and the Talas area is especially saturated with religious monuments and historical reports. the Gagauzes, a distinct Pontic Turkic tribe known for their steadfast adherence to Greek Orthodox Christianity, have a folk legend associating their descent from the Chigils.

An Arab writer named Abū Dulaf reported to have found only a few Christians among the Chigil, while most worshipped "the stars", in particular Sirius.

In Manichaeism, the lion, mighty and ruthless king of animals, is a central image. This demonstrates an imported ideology; the lion is not native to Central Asia, and so it originally did not have symbolic significance for the population there. The building found by the archaeologists, without traces of economic activities, served as a chapel of the inhabitants depicted in long robes: the Chigils, whose symbol was a lion (Turk. Arslan, Bars).

The connection between Talas, Manichaeism and the Lion is recorded in the Turco-Manichean "Sacred book of two fundamentals" (Iki jïltïz nom), fragments of which were found in 1907 at Kara-Khoja in the Turpan oasis by Albert von Le Coq. The book was dedicated to the ruler (Beg) of the Chigil-Arslan tribe, named Il Tirgüg, Ap Burguchan, Alp Tarhan [Henning, 1977, p. 552]. It was completed in Argu-Talas city (Altun Argu Talas). A postscript in the manuscript noted an Arslan Mengü that used the book. Talas had four Manichean cloisters: in the Chigil-balyk, Kashu, Ordu-kent and Yigyan-kent.

In the middle of the 7th century, Chigils, Chumuls and Karluks were united by the Western Turkic yabgu Ashina Helu in his anti-Tang uprising. Zuev reconstructs Helu's Old Turkic name as *Aru, which, he contends, is identical with the Turkic-Manichean arïg (like arïg dïntar "pure priest").

== Toponymic traces ==
Many settlements recorded in medieval sources have names derived from the ethnonym Chigil, such as Chigil-kant and Chigil-balyk in Xinjiang, and Chigil in the Zhetysu area:

During the Middle Ages, a city, Yar, is mentioned as located on the southern bank of lake Issyk-kul. This city is the capital of the leader of the Djikil (i.e. Chigil) tribe. The city retained its name in the form Chal till present. The various forms of this toponym (Shiyan, Shal, Chal) come from the Turkic ethnonym Chiyal (i.e. Chigil).

== Known Rulers ==
1. Alp Il Tirgüg Arslan Khan (Il Tirgüg) (𐰀𐰞𐰯 𐰃𐰞𐱃𐰄𐰺𐰏𐰈𐰏 𐰀𐰺𐰽𐰞𐰀𐰣 𐰚𐰎𐰀𐰣)
2. Alp Burguchan Arslan Khan (Ap Burguchan) (𐰀𐰯𐰉𐰆𐰺𐰏𐰆𐰕𐰎𐰀𐰣 𐰀𐰺𐰽𐰞𐰀𐰣 𐰚𐰎𐰀𐰣)
3. Alp Tarhan Arslan Khan (𐰀𐰞𐰯-𐱃𐰀𐰺𐰎𐰀𐰣 𐰀𐰅𐰽𐰞𐰀𐰣 𐰚𐰎𐰀𐰣)
