= Karluks =

Medieval Turkic tribal confederacy of Central Asia

Languages
- Karluk languages (i.e. Uzbek, Uyghur, Ili Turki)

Religion
- Tengrism, Islam, Nestorian Christianity

Related ethnic groups
- Uzbeks, Uyghurs

The Karluks (also Qarluqs, Qarluks, Karluqs, Old Turkic: 𐰴𐰺𐰞𐰸, Qarluq, Para-Mongol: Harluut, simplified Chinese: 葛逻禄; traditional Chinese: 葛邏祿 Géluólù; customary phonetic: Gelu, Khololo, Khorlo, Persian: خَلُّخ, Khallokh, Arabic: قارلوق Qarluq) were a prominent nomadic Turkic tribal confederacy residing in the regions of Kara-Irtysh (Black Irtysh) and the Tarbagatai Mountains west of the Altay Mountains in Central Asia around the 5th-8th centuries, CE.

The majority of Uzbeks and Uyghurs indeed descend from Karluk tribes, and their languages are part of the Karluk subgroup, making them linguistically and historically distinct from other Turkic peoples like Kazakhs (Kipchak) or Turkmens (Oghuz).

A section of the Hazara people are considered to be descended from the Karluks.

Karluks were known as a coherent ethnic group (with autonomous status within the Göktürk khaganate and an independent one in their subsequent states of the Karluk yabghu, Karakhanids and Qarlughids) before being absorbed in the Chagatai Khanate of the Mongol Empire, which would soon be Karlukified and eventually birthed the future Karluk imperial states like the Timurid Empire, Moghulistan, and Mughal Empire. In an equivalent term, the Karluks could also be traced from the non-Karluk people that chose to be assimilated to their frameworks and became Karluks, as seen with the case of the Khanate of Bukhara under the Kipchak Shaybanids and Janids.

They were also called Uch-Oghuz meaning "Three Oghuz". Despite the similarity of names, Mahmud al-Kashgari's Dīwān Lughāt al-Turk wrote: "Karluks is a division of nomadic Turks. They are separate from Oghuz, but they are Turkmens like Oghuz." Ilkhanate's Rashid al-Din Hamadani in his Jami' al-tawarikh mentions Karluks as one of the Oghuz (Turkmen) tribes. İbrahim Kafesoğlu (1958) proposes that Türkmen might be the Karluks' equivalent of the Göktürks' political term Kök Türk.

== Etymology ==
Nikolai Aristov noted that a tributary of the Charysh was Kerlyk and proposed that the tribal name originated from the toponym with a Turkic meaning of "wild Siberian millet".

Peter Golden, citing Németh, suggests that qarluğ/qarluq possibly means "snowy" (from Proto-Turkic *qar "snow"). However, Marcel Erdal critiques this as a folk etymology, as "[i]n Old Turkic the suffix +lXk, which is implied in this account, had fourfold vowel harmony, and the +lXk derivate from kar would in Old Turkic be *karlık and not karluk".

Having noted that the majority of Chinese transcriptions 歌邏祿, 歌羅祿, 葛邏祿, 葛羅祿 and 哥邏祿 (all romanized as Geluolu) are trisyllabic, while only one form 葛祿 (Gelu) is disyllabic, Erdal contends that although the latter one transcribed Qarluq, the former four transcribed *Qaraluq, which should be the preferred reading. Thus, Erdal concluded that "the name is likely to be an exonym, formed as an -(O)k derivate from the verb kar-ıl- 'to mingle (intr.)' discussed in Erdal (1991: 662); it would thus have signified 'the mingled ones', presumably because the tribe evolved from the mingling of discrete groups," as already suggested by Doerfer.

== History ==
=== Early history ===
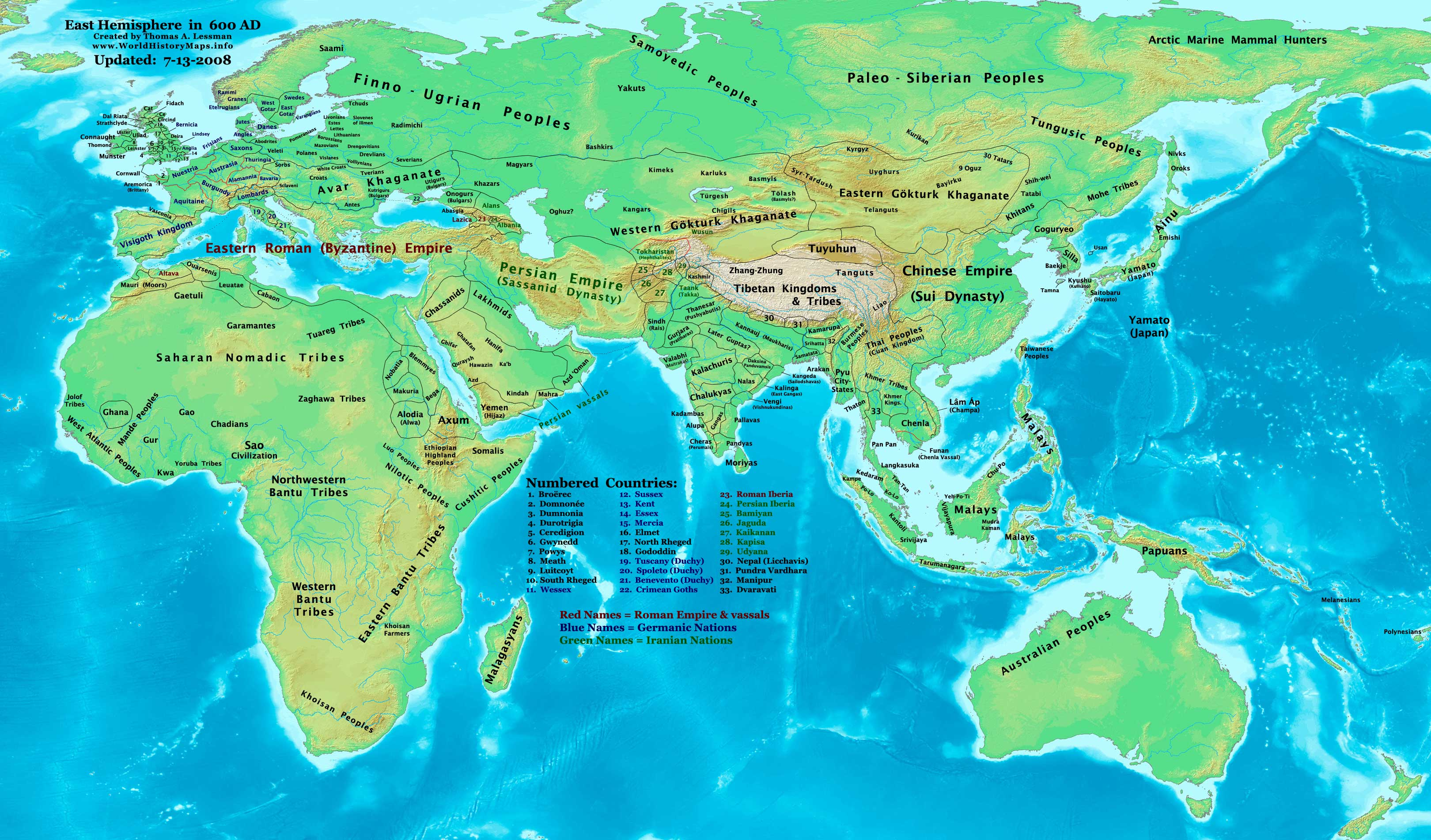
Asia in 600, showing the location of the Karluk tribes (modern-day east Kazakhstan).

The first Chinese reference to the Karluks (644) labels them with a Manichaean attribute: Lion Karluks ("Shi-Geluolu", "shi" stands for Sogdian "lion"). The "lion" (Turkish: arslan) Karluks persisted up to the time of the Mongols.

In the Early Middle Ages, three member tribes of the Göktürk Khaganate formed the Uch-Karluk (Three Karluks) union; initially, the union's leader bore the title Elteber, later elevated to Yabgu. After the split of the khaganate around 600 into the Western and Eastern khaganates, the Uch-Karluks (三姓葛邏祿), along with Chuyue (處月; later as Shatuo 沙陀), Chumi (處蜜), Gusu (姑蘇), and Beishi (卑失) became subordinate to the Western Turkic Khaganate. After the Göktürks' downfall, the Karluk confederation would later incorporate other Turkic tribes like the Chigils, Tuhsi, Azkishi, Türgesh, Khalajes, Čaruk, Barsqan, as well as Iranian Sogdians and West Asian and Central Asian migrants.

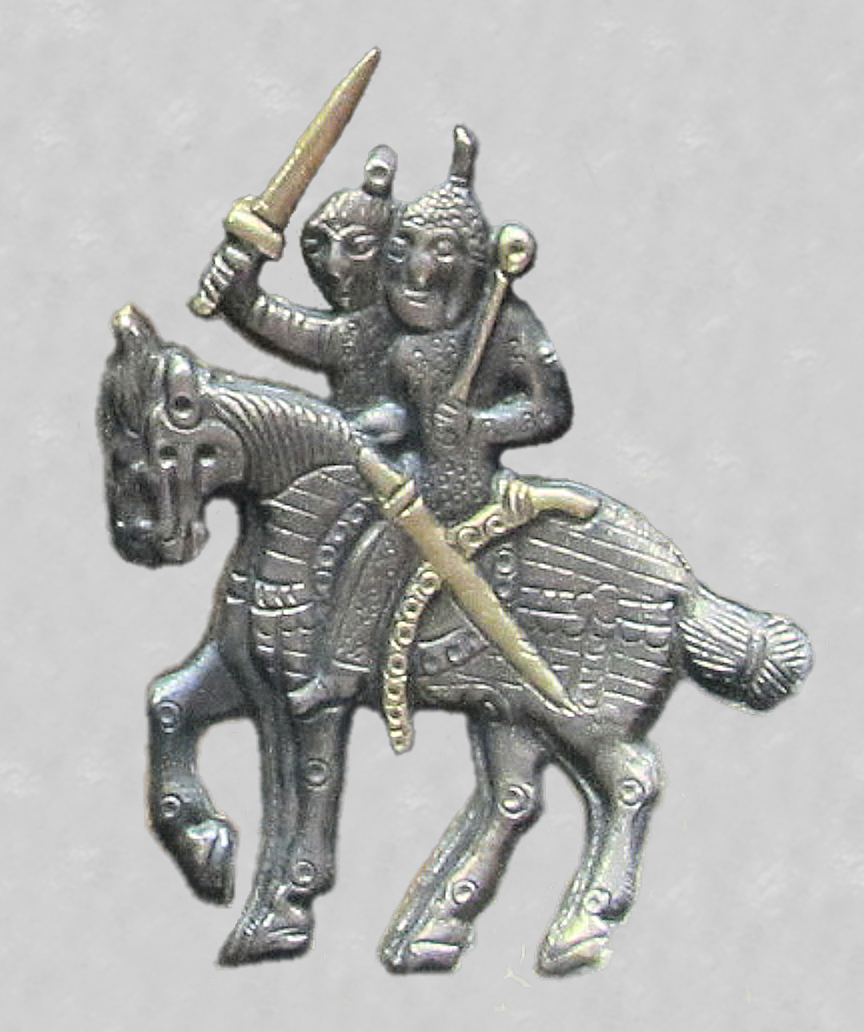
Armoured horsemen on the Anikova dish, Semirechye, c. 800.

In 630, Ashina Helu, the Ishbara Qaghan of the Eastern Turkic Khaganate, was captured by the Chinese. His heir apparent, the "lesser Khan" Hubo, escaped to Altai with a major part of the people and 30,000 soldiers. He conquered the Karluks in the west, the Kyrgyz in the north, and took the title Yizhuchebi Khagan. The Karluks allied with the Tiele and their leaders the Uyghurs against the Turkic Khaganate, and participated in enthroning the victorious head of the Uyghurs (Toquz Oghuz). After that, a smaller part of the Karluks joined the Uyghurs and settled in the Bogdo-Ola mountains in Mongolia, the larger part settled in the area between Altai and the eastern Tian Shan.

In 650, at the time of their submission to the Chinese, the Karluks had three tribes: Mouluo 謀落/Moula 謀剌 (*Bulaq), Chisi 熾俟 (Note: Golden (1992) hesitantly identifies Chisi with Chuyue; Atwood (2010: 600-601) identified Chisi 熾俟 with Zhusi 朱斯, also mentioned in Xiu Tangshu. Atwood does not link Chisi 熾俟 ~ Zhusi 朱斯 to Chuyue 處月, but instead to Zhuxie 朱邪, the original tribal surname of the Shatuo ruling house) or Suofu 娑匐 (Note: also attested as Pofu 婆匐 & Posuo 婆娑. Ecsedy (1980) contended that 娑 (Suo), not 婆 (Po), was correct) (*Sebeg), and Tashili 踏實力 (*Taşlïq). On paper, the Karluk divisions received Chinese names as Chinese provinces, and their leaders received Chinese state titles. Later, the Karluks spread from the valley of the river Kerlyk along the Irtysh River in the western part of the Altai to beyond the Black Irtysh, Tarbagatai, and towards the Tian Shan.

By the year 665, the Karluk union was led by a former Uch-Karluk bey with the title Kül-Erkin, now titled "Yabgu" (prince), who had a powerful army. The Karluk vanguard left the Altai region and at the beginning of the 8th century reached the banks of the Amu Darya.

They were considered a vassal state by the Tang dynasty after the final conquest of the Transoxania regions by the Chinese in 739. The Karluk rose in rebellion against the Göktürks, then the dominant tribal confederation in the region, in about 745, and established a new tribal confederation with the Uygur and Basmyl tribes. However, Karluks and Basmyls were defeated and forcibly incorporated into the Toquz Oghuz tribal confederation, led by the Uyghur Yaglakar clan. They remained in the Chinese sphere of influence and an active participant in fighting the Muslim expansion into the area, up until their split from the Tang in 751. Chinese intervention in the affairs of Western Turkestan ceased after their defeat at the Battle of Talas in 751 by the Arab general Ziyad ibn Salih. The Arabs dislodged the Karluks from Fergana.

In 766, after they overran the Türgesh in Jetisu, the Karluk tribes formed a Khanate under the rule of a Yabghu, occupied Suyab and transferred their capital there. By that time the bulk of the tribe had left the Altai, and the supremacy in Jetisu passed to the Karluks. Their ruler with the title Yabghu is often mentioned in the Orkhon inscriptions. In Pahlavi texts one of the Karluk rulers of Tocharistan was called Yabbu-Hakan (Yabghu-Khagan). The fall of the Western Turkic Kaganate left Jetisu in the possession of Turkic peoples, independent of either Arabs or Chinese.

In 822, the Uyghurs sent four Karluks as tribute to Tang dynasty of China.

==== Culture ====
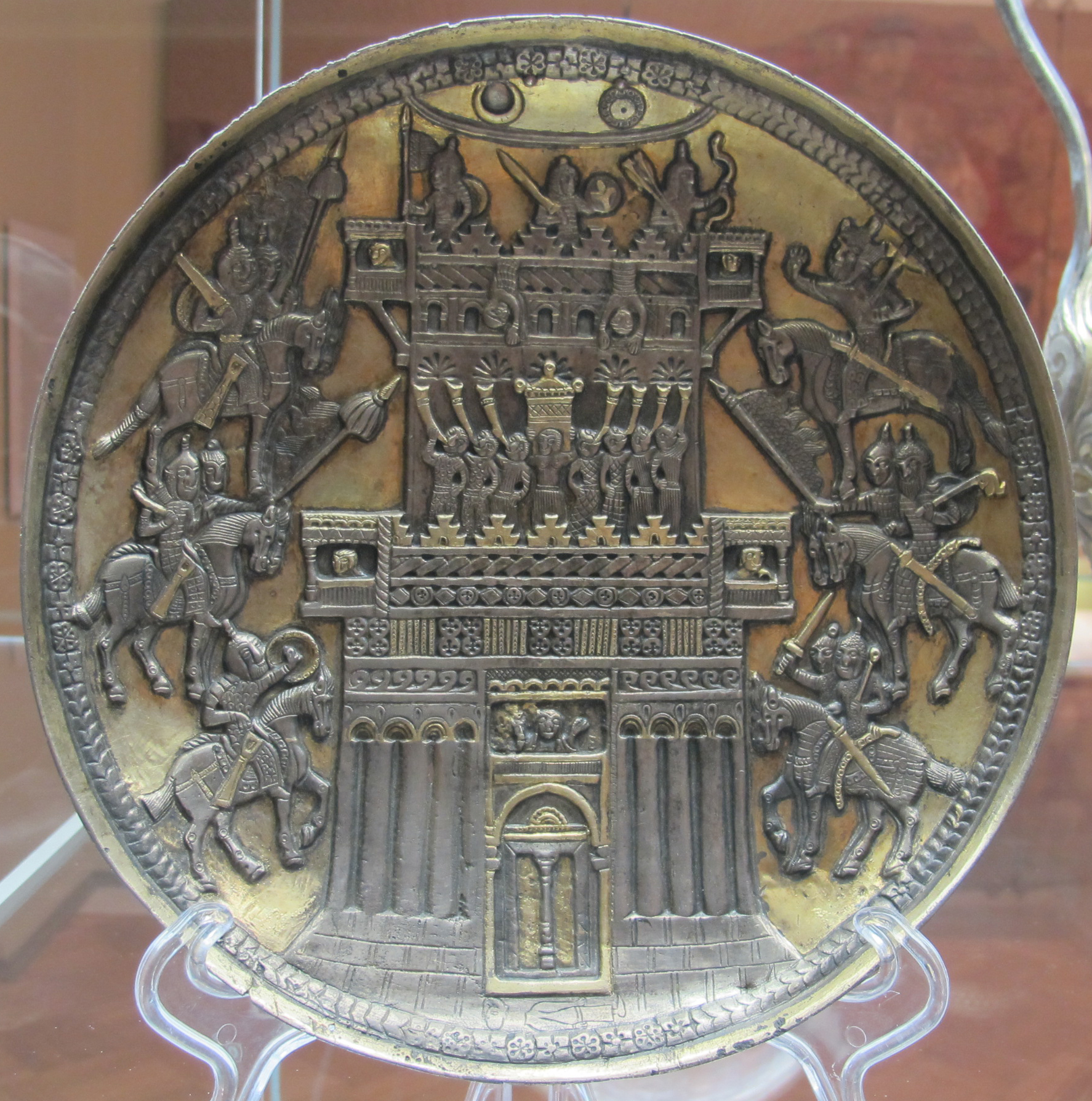
The Anikova dish: a Nestorian Christian plate with decoration of a besieged Jericho, by Sogdian artists under Karluk dominion, Semirechye. 9th-10th century, copied from an 8th century plate with designs and military equipment related to Penjikent.

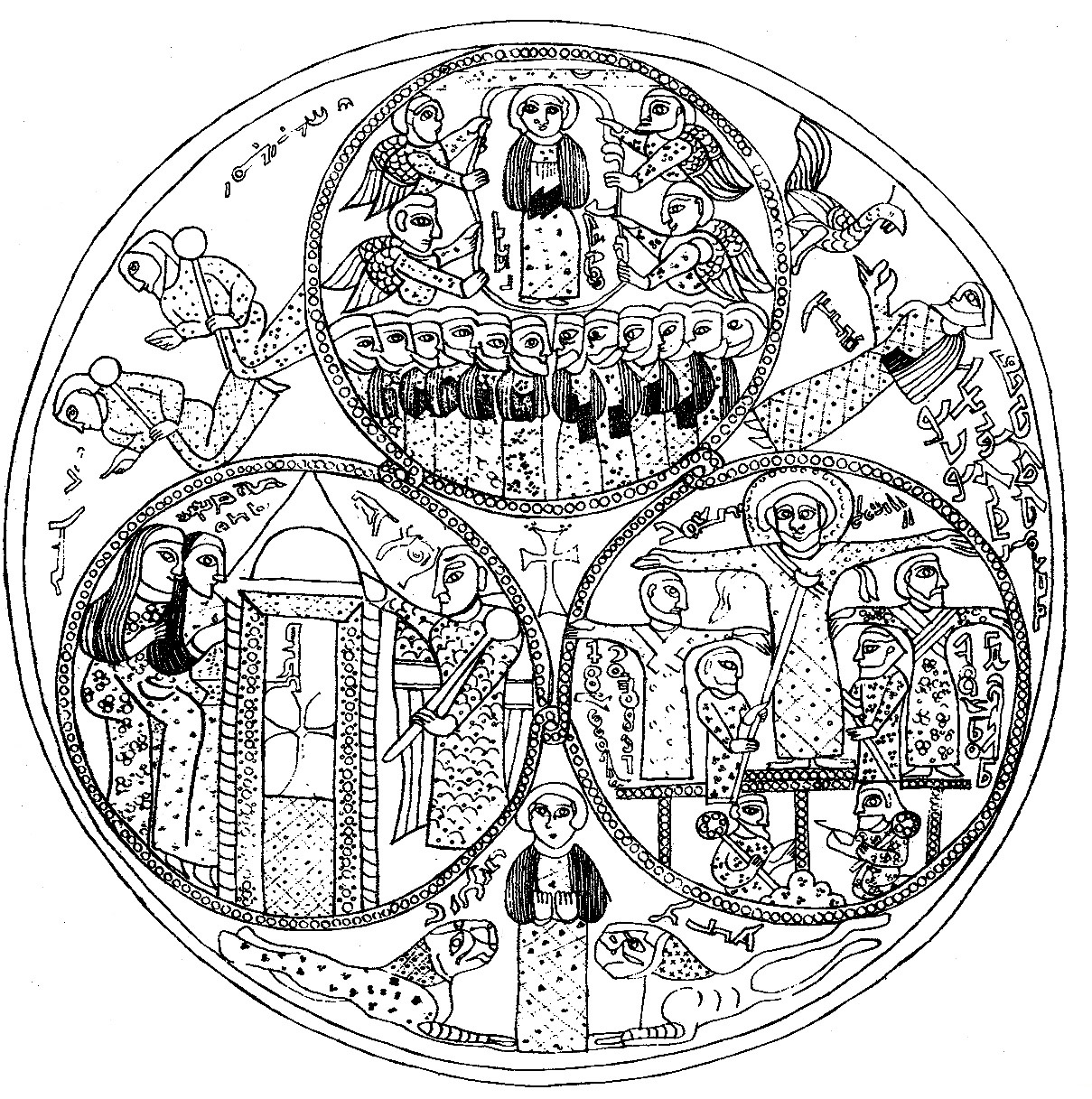
The Grigorovskoye Plate: a Nestorian Christian dish with Syriac inscriptions, from Semirechye, 9th–10th century CE, created under Karluk dominion.

The Karluks were hunters, nomadic herdsmen, and agriculturists. They settled in the countryside and in the cities, which were centered on trading posts along the caravan roads. The Karluks inherited a vast multi-ethnic region, whose diverse population was not much different from its rulers. Jetisu was populated by several tribes: the Azes (mentioned in the Orkhon inscriptions) and the Tuhsi, remnants of the Türgesh; as well as the Shatuo Turks (沙陀突厥) (lit. "Sandy Slope Turks", i.e. "Desert Turks") of Western Turkic, specifically of Chigil origins, and the interspersing Sogdian colonies. The southern part of Jetisu was occupied by the Yagma people, who also held Kashgar. In the north and west lived the Kangly. Chigils, who had joined and been a significant division of the Three-Karluks, then detached and resided around Issyk Kul.

The diverse population adhered to a spectrum of religious beliefs. The Karluks and the majority of the Turkic population professed Tengrianism, considered as shamanism and heathen by the Christians and Muslims. The Karluks converted to Nestorian Christianity at the end of the 8th century CE, about 15 years after they established themselves in the Jetisu region. This was the first time the Church of the East received such major sponsorship by an eastern power. Particularly, the Chigils were Christians of the Nestorian denomination. The majority of the Toquz Oghuz, with their khan, were Manicheans, but there were also Christians, Buddhists, and Muslims among them.

The peaceful penetration of Muslim culture through commercial relations played a far more important role in their conversion than Muslim arms. The merchants were followed by missionaries of various creeds, including Nestorian Christians. Many Turkestan towns had Christian churches. The Turks held sacred the Qastek pass mountains, believing to be an abode of the deity. Each creed carried its script, resulting in a variety of used scripts, including Türkic runiform, Sogdian, Syriac, and later the Uygur. The Karluks had adopted and developed the Turkic literary language of Khwarazm, established in Bukhara and Samarkand, which after the Mongol conquest became known as the Chagatai language.

Of all Turkic peoples, the Karluks were most open to the influence of Muslim culture. Yaqubi reported the conversion of the Karluk-yabghu to Islam under Caliph Mahdi (775–785), and by the 10th century, several places to the east of Talas had mosques. Muslim culture had affected the general way of life of the Karluks.

During the next three centuries, the Karluk Yabgu state (later Kara-Khanid Khanate) occupied a key position on the international trade route, fighting off mostly Turkic competitors to retain their prime position. Their biggest adversaries were Kangly in the northwest and Toquz Oghuz in the southeast, with a period of Samanid raids to Jetisu in 840–894. But even in the heyday of the Karluk Yabgu state, parts of its domains were in the hands of the Toquz Oghuz, and later under Kyrgyz and Khitan control, increasing the ethnical, religious, and political diversity.

==== Social organization ====
The state of Karluk Yabghu was an association of semi-independent districts and cities, each equipped with its own militia. The biggest was the capital Suyab, which could turn out 20,000 warriors, and among other districts, the town of Beglilig (known as "Samakna" before Karluk rule) had 10,000 warriors, Panjikat could turn out 8,000 warriors, Barskhan 6,000 warriors, and Yar 3,000 warriors. The titles of the petty rulers were Qutegin of the Karluk Laban clan in Karminkat, Taksin in Jil, Tabin-Barskhan in Barskhan, Turkic Yindl-Tegin and Sogdian Badan-Sangu in Beglilig. The prince of Suyab, situated north of the Chu river in the Türgesh land, was a brother of one of the Göktürk khans, but bore the Persian title Yalan-shah, i.e. "King of Heroes".

Muslim authors describe in detail the trade route from Western Asia to China across Jetisu, mentioning many cities. Some bore double names, both Turkic and Sogdian. They wrote about the capital cities of Balasagun, Suyab, and Kayalik, in which William of Rubruck saw three Buddhist temples in the Muslim town for the first time. The geographers also mentioned Taraz (Talas, Auliya-ata), Navekat (now Karabulak), Atbash (now Koshoy-Kurgan ruins), Issyk-kul, Barskhan, Panjikat, Akhsikat, Beglilig, Almalik, Jul, Yar, Ton, Panchul, and others.

=== Kyrgyz period ===
Prior to the Kyrgyz-Uyghur war of 829–840, the Kyrgyz lived in the upper basin of the Yenisei River. Linguistically their language, together with the Altai language, belongs to a separate Kyrgyz group of the Turkic language family. At that time they had an estimated population of 250,000 and an army of 50,000. Kyrgyz victory in the war brought them to the Karluk door. They captured Tuva, Altai, a part of Dzungaria, and reached Kashgar. Allied with the Karluks against the Uyghurs, in the 840s the Kyrgyz started the occupation of that part of Jetisu which is their present home. Karluk independence ended around 840. They fell from dominating the tribal association to a subordinate position. The Kyrgyz remained a power in Jetisu until their destruction by the Kara-Khitans in 1124, when most of them evacuated from their center in Tuva back to the Minusinsk Depression, leaving the Karluks to predominate again in Jetisu.

The position of the Karluk state, based on the rich Jetisu cities, remained strong, despite the failures in wars in the beginning of the 9th century. Yabghu was enriched by profitable trade in slaves on the Syr Darya slave markets, selling guards for the Abbasid Caliphs, and exercising control over the transit road to China in the sector from Taraz to Issyk-Kul. The Karluk position in Fergana, despite Arab attempts to expel them, became stronger.

The fall of the last khagan with its capital in Ötüken, which dominated for three centuries, created a completely new geopolitical situation in all Central Asia. For the first time in three hundred years, the powerful center of authority that created opportunities for expansion or even existence of any state in Turkestan had finally disappeared. Henceforth, the Turkic tribes recognized only the high status of the clan that inherited the Khagan title, but never again his unifying authority. Several Muslim historians state that after the loss by the Uyghurs of their power (840), the supreme authority among the Turkic tribes passed to the Karluk leaders. Connection with the Ashina clan, the ruling clan of the Turkic Khaganate, allowed the Karluk dynasty to dress their authority with legitimate attire, and, abandoning the old title Yabghu, to take on the new title of Khagan.

=== Karakhanid period ===
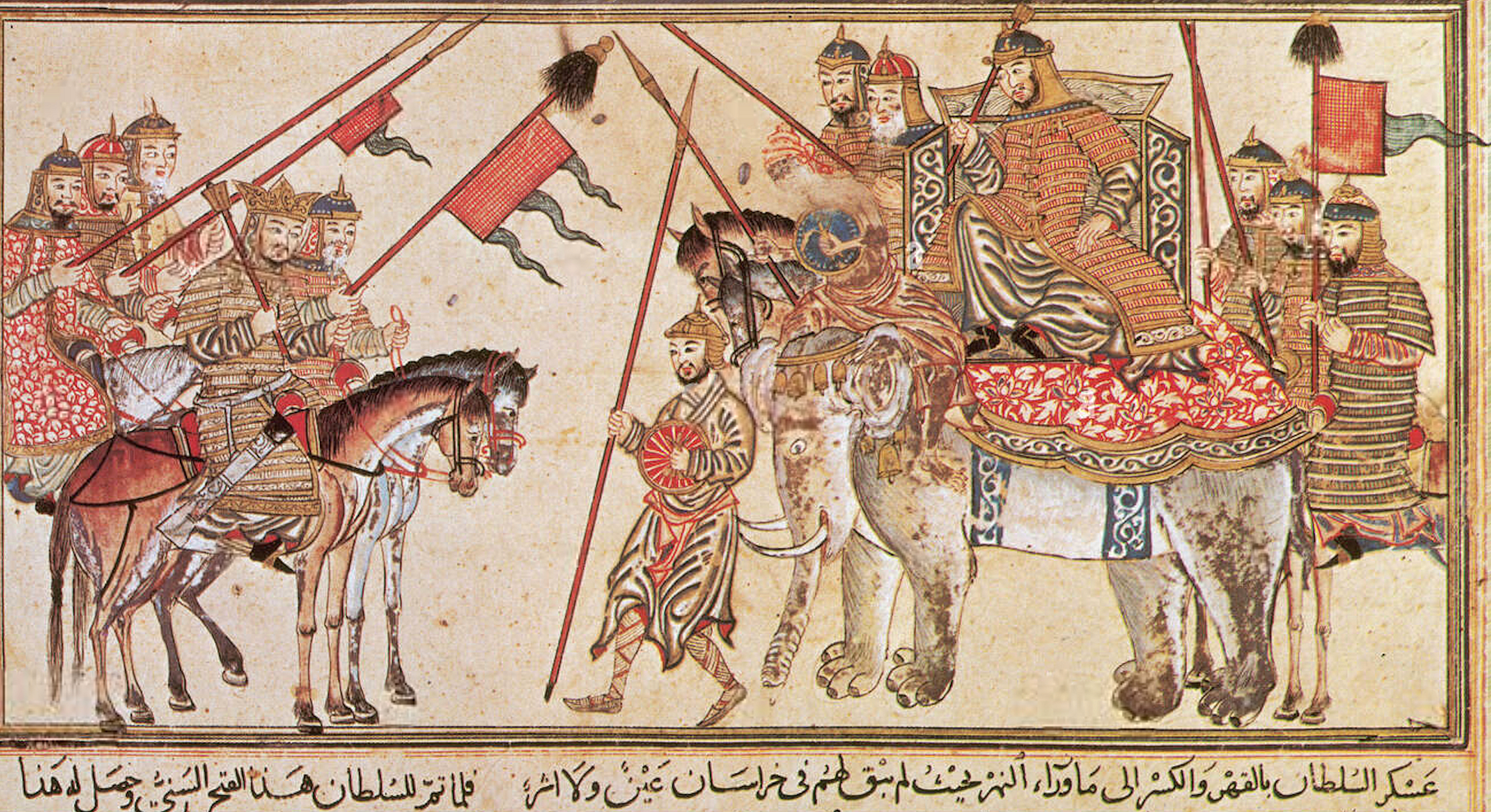
The Kara-Khanid ruler "Ilig Khan" on horse, submitting to Ghaznavid ruler Mahmud of Ghazni, who is riding an elephant, in 1017. They agreed to partition former Samanid territory along the Oxus river. Jami' al-tawarikh, circa 1306–14.

Towards 940 the "heathen" Yagma from the southern border seized the Chu river valley and the Karluk capital Balasagun. The Yagma ruler bore the title Bogra Khan (Camel Khan), very common among Karakhanids. The Yagma quickly proceeded to take control of all Karluk lands. In the 10th and 12th centuries, the lands on both sides of the principal chain of the Tian Shan were united under the rule of the Karakhanid Ilek-khans (Khans of the Land) or simply Karakhanids (Great Khans). The Karakhanid state was divided into fiefs which soon became independent.

The Kara-Khanid Khanate was founded in the 9th century from a confederation of Karluks, Chigils, Yagmas, and other tribes. Later in the 10th century a Karakhanid Sultan Satuq Bughra Khan converted to Islam. His son Musa made Islam a state religion in 960. The empire occupied modern northern Iran and parts of Central Asia. This region remained under the Karakhanids, but for varying periods it was an autonomous vassal of Seljuks and Kara-Khitans. The Karakhanid Khanate ended when the last ruler of its western khanate was killed by the Khwarezmids in 1212. Both the Kara-Khitans and the Khwarezmids were later destroyed by the Mongol invasion.

The name Khāqāniyya was given to the Karluks who inhabited Kashgar and Balasagun, whose inhabitants were not Uyghur however their language has been retroactively labelled as Uyghur by scholars.

=== Khitan period ===
At the beginning of the 10th century, a tribe related to the Mongols, the Khitans, with an admixture of Mongols, founded a vast empire, stretching from the Pacific to Lake Baikal and the Tian Shan, displacing the Turkic population. The Khitan language has been classified as para-Mongolic: distantly related to the Mongolic languages of the Mongols. Reportedly, the first Gurkhan was a Manichaean.

Owing to its long sway over China, the ruling dynasty, which the Twenty-Four Histories call the Liao dynasty (916–1125), was strongly influenced by Chinese culture. In 1125, a Tungusic people, the Jurchen, allied with the Southern Song, ending the domination of the Khitans. The Khitan exiles, headed by Yelü Dashi, a member of the Khitan royal family, migrated westwards. The Khitans settled in the Tarbagatai Mountains east of Jetisu, and their number grew to 40,000 tents.

Around 1130 the local Karakhanid ruler of Balasagun asked for their aid against the hostile Kankalis and Karluks. The Khitans occupied Balasagun, expelled the weak Karakhanid ruler, and founded their own state, which stretched from the Yenisei to Taraz. They then conquered the Kankalis and subdued Xinjiang. In 1137 near Khujand they defeated the Transoxanian Karakhanid ruler Mahmud Khan, who then appealed to their suzerain the Seljuks for help. The Kara-Khitans, who were also invited by the Khwarazmians (then also a vassal of the Seljuks) to conquer the lands of the Seljuks as well as in response to an appeal to intervene by the Karluks who were involved in a conflict with the Karakhanids, then advanced to Samarkand. In 1141, the Seljuks under Ahmad Sanjar also arrived in Samarkand with his army, but was defeated by the Kara-Khitans in the Battle of Qatwan, after which the Kara-Khitans became dominant in Transoxania.

The western Khitan state became known under its Turkic name, the Kara-Khitan Khanate and their ruler bore the Turkic title Gurkhan "Khan's son-in law". The original Uch-Karluk confederation became split between the Karakhanid state in the west and the Karakhitay state in the east, lasting until the Mongol invasion. Both in the west and east, Karluk principalities retained their autonomous status and indigenous rulers, though in Karakhitay the Karluk khan, like the ruler of Samarkand, was forced to accept the presence of a permanent representative of the Gurkhan.

The Gurkhans administered limited territories, populated in 1170 by 84,500 families under direct rule. The Gurkhan's headquarters was called Khosun-ordu (lit. "Strong Ordu"), or Khoto ("House"). The Karluk capital was Kayalik. The Karakhanids continued to rule over Transoxania and western Xinjiang. The Kara-khitans did not interfere with the religion of the people, but Islam became less dominant as the other religions took advantage of the new freedom to increase the number of their adherents. The Nestorian Patriarch Elias III (1176–1190) founded a religious metropole in Kashgar. The Karakhitay metropolitan bore the title Metropolitan of Kashghar and Navakat, showing that the see of Kashghar also controlled the southern part of Zhetysu. The oldest Nestorian tombs in the Tokmak and Pishpek cemeteries go back to the epoch of Karakhitay domination. Ata-Malik Juvayni however stressed the oppression of Muslims by Kuchlug, a son of the last Nayman khan who was ousted (towards 1204) by Mongolia by Genghis Khan. The Nayman Nestorian Christian Küchlük usurped the throne of the Kara-Khitans. In 1211, a Mongol detachment under the command of Khubilai Noyon, one of Genghis Khan's generals, appeared in the northern part of Zhetysu. Arslan-khan Karluk killed the Karakhitay governor of Kayalik and proclaimed his loyalty to Genghis Khan. The Zhetysu, together with Eastern Turkestan, voluntarily surrendered to the Mongols. Kuchlug was killed by the invading Mongols in 1218.

=== Mongol era ===
In 1211, a Mongol detachment under the command of Qubilai Noyon appeared in the northern part of Jetisu. Karluk Arslan Khan, probably the son of Arslan khan and brother of Mamdu khan, killed the Khitan governor of Kayalik and proclaimed his loyalty to Genghis Khan. The Collection of Annals records that Genghis Khan removed his title from Karluk Arslan Khan: "Let your name be Sartaktai", i.e. Sart, said the sovereign.

After the absorption of the Kara-Khanid Khanate by the Chagatai Khanate, the ethnonym Karluk became rarely used. The Karluk language was the primary basis for the later lingua franca of the Chagatai Khanate and Central Asia under the Timurid dynasty, from which it carried on to dominate Central Asia as the Timurid Empire, and later the Mughal Empire in South Asia. It is therefore designated by linguists and historians as the Chagatai language, but its contemporaries, such as Timur and Babur, simply called it Turki or in several occasions, as Turcoman. The Chagatai Karluk culture survived even after the Kipchak Shaybanid conquest of Transoxiana and establishment of the Khanate of Bukhara, in which the Uzbek Shaybanids and later Janids also got assimilated, turning the Khanate of Bukhara from its Kipchak origin to a Karluk-dominated one.

== Genetics ==
A genetic study published in Nature in May 2018 examined the remains of two Karluk males buried at Butakty in the Tian Shan between 800 AD and 1000 AD. One male carried the paternal haplogroup J2a and the maternal haplogroup A, while the other carried the maternal haplogroup F1b1e.

In another study of nine Karluk individual samples from an archaeological site in Tajikistan. The researchers found that all of the nine samples belonged to the special lineage, L-M20.

A genetic study published in Science Advances in March 2021 examined the remains of a Karluk male. The Karluk male carried the paternal haplogroup C2 and the maternal haplogroup D4.

== See also ==
- Toghon Temür mother was Mailaiti, descendant of Arslan Khan
- Bulaqs
- Qarlugh

== Sources ==
- Damgaard, P. B.; et al. (May 9, 2018). "137 ancient human genomes from across the Eurasian steppes". Nature. 557 (7705). Nature Research: 369–373. Bibcode:2018Natur.557..369D. doi:10.1038/s41586-018-0094-2. hdl:1887/3202709. PMID 29743675. S2CID 13670282.
- Z. V. Togan: The Origins of the Kazaks and the ôzbeks, H.B. Paksoy, IUE.it, webpage: IUE-5 Archived 2020-11-08 at the Wayback Machine.
