= Karluk Yabghu =

756–840 Karluk Turkic polity in Central Asia

Karluk Yabghu State
- 742–840
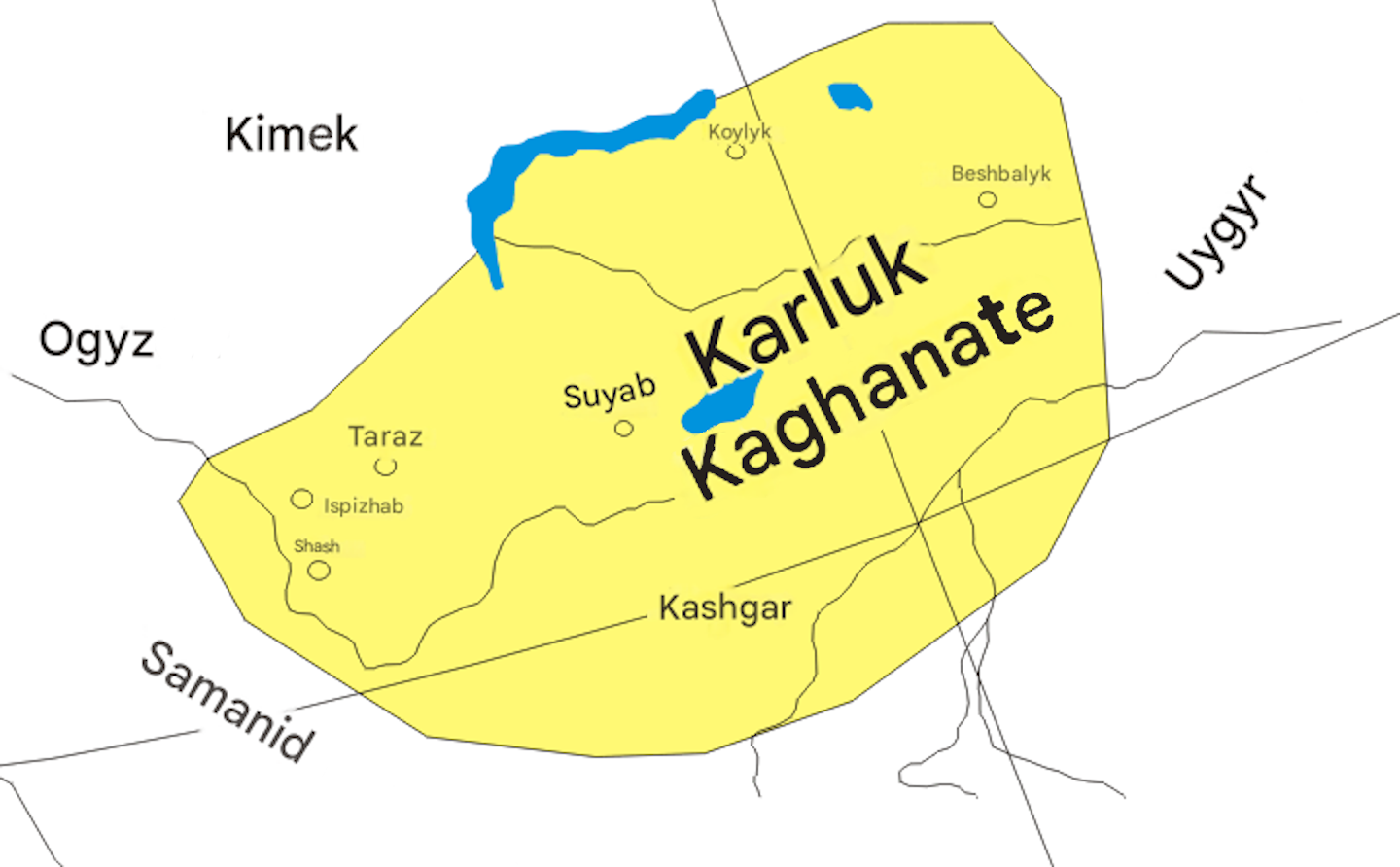

- Location of the Karluk Yabghu, with contemporary polities circa 800 CE
- Capital: Suyab later Balasagun
- Common languages: Karluk Turkic
- Religion: Tengriism, Nestorian Christianity
- Government: Monarchy
- History
  - Established: 742
  - Disestablished: 840
Preceded by	Succeeded by
Türgesh	Kara-Khanid Khanate
- Today part of: China; Kazakhstan; Kyrgyzstan

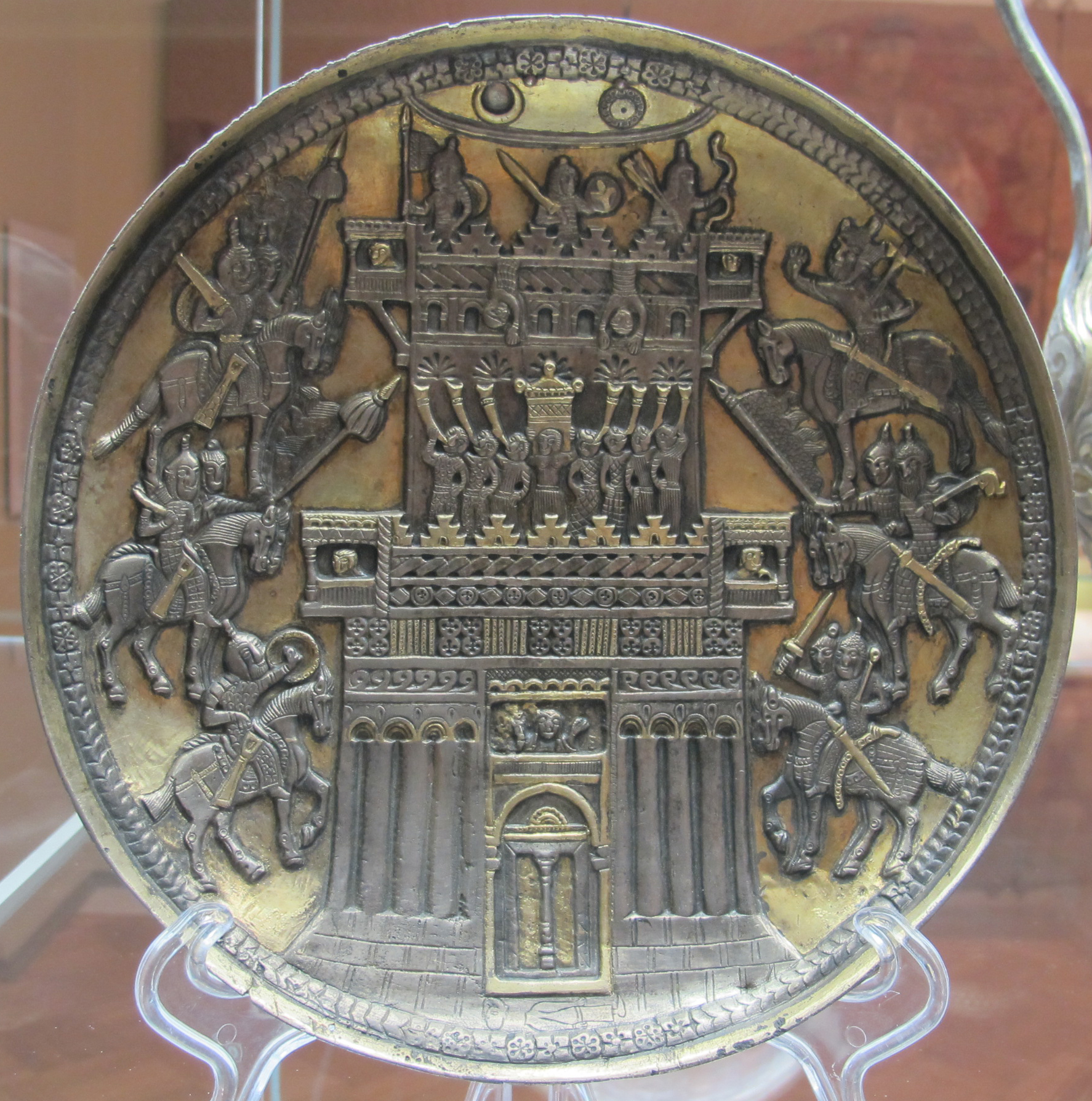
Anikova dish: Nestorian Christian plate with decoration of the Siege of Jericho, probably made by Sogdian artists under Karluk dominion, in Semirechye. Cast silver of the 9th-10th century, copied from an original 8th century plate.

The Karluk Yabghu (Old Turkic: 𐰴𐰺𐰞𐰸:𐰉𐰆𐰑𐰣, romanized: Qarluq budun, lit. 'Karluk people'; simplified Chinese: 葛逻禄叶护国; traditional Chinese: 葛邏祿葉護國; pinyin: Géluólù Yèhùguó) was a polity ruled by Karluk tribes, estimated to have existed between the 5th-8th centuries CE.

== History ==
The first information about the tribes of Karluks that occupied the territory between Altai and the Eastern coast of Lake Balkhash dates back to the 5th century. The Karluks were part of the First Turkic and Uyghur khaganates. Karluk leaders held the title Kül-Erkin as vassals of Göktürks, a rank of medium importance in the First Turkic Khaganate.

They were composed of three tribes, therefore their ruler was mostly called Üç Karluk Bey (Chinese: 三姓葉護, Sanxing Yabghu; lit. 'Yabghu of Three Tribes') in the 8th century (Although Bey and Yabghu are different.). At least one Kül Erkin held the title Yabghu while still acknowledging the suzerainty of Gokturk Khagan.

In 742, they were named "Saɣ Yabghu ( 𐰖𐰀𐰉𐰏𐰎𐰆 𐰽𐰀𐰍, tr. Right Yabghu) " by Basmyl khagan Ashina Shi. Like Basmyls, they were ruled by a branch of the Ashina tribe. However, the reign of Basmyl was cut short when they were defeated by a Karluk-Uyghur coalition. Uyghur Khagan gave the Saɣ Yabghu a new and higher title: 'Sol Yabghu (𐰽𐰗𐰞 𐰖𐰀𐰉𐰏𐰎𐰆, tr. Left Yabghu)'.

At the same time a group of Karluks elected Bilge Yabghu Tun Apa Yigen Chor (Old Turkic:𐰉𐰄𐰞𐰏𐰅 𐰖𐰀𐰉𐰏𐰎𐰆 𐱃𐰆𐰣 𐰀𐰯𐰀 𐰖𐰄𐰏𐰅𐰣 𐰕𐰎𐰗𐰺; Bilgä Yabɣu Toŋa Apa Yigen Čor, Chinese: 毗伽葉護頓阿波移健啜; pinyin: Píjiā Yèhù Dùn ābō Yíjiàn Chuài) who submitted to the Uyghur Khaganate in 746. He may be same person as Yigen Chor (𐰘𐰃𐰏𐰤𐰲𐰆𐰺) mentioned in Kul-Chor stele.

He was succeeded by Tun Bilge Yabghu (Chinese: 頓毗伽葉護; pinyin: Dùn Píjiā Yèhù) in 753. A ruler of Karluks were mentioned in Turco-Manichean book "Sacred Book of Two Fundamentals" (Iki Jïltïz Nom), fragments of which were found in 1907 at Kara-Khoja in the Turpan oasis by Albert von Le Coq. The book was dedicated to the ruler of the Chigil tribes, named Alp Burguchan, Alp Tarhan, Alp İl Tirgüg. He probably was the one who conquered Turgesh state and resettled Karluks in Zhetysu basin, making Suyab their capital.

Another ruler was Köbäk, whose coins were found in modern Kyrgyzstan. He used the title 'Khagan' in his coins.

When the Yenisei Kyrgyz destroyed the Uyghur Khaganate in 840, Karluk yabghu declared himself khagan with title Bilge Kul Qadir Khan, forming the Kara-Khanid Khanate.

== Known Yabghus ==
1. Bilga İshbara Tamgan Tarkan? (𐰉𐰄𐰞𐰏𐰀 𐰄𐰽𐰎𐰉𐰀𐰺𐰀 𐱃𐰀𐰢𐰏𐰀𐰣 𐱃𐰀𐰺𐰚𐰀𐰣) – Nephew of Ilterish Qaghan.
2. Ishbara Tamgan Chor? (𐰃𐰽𐰎𐰉𐰀𐰺𐰀 𐱃𐰀𐰢𐰏𐰀𐰣 𐰕𐰎𐰗𐰺) – Brother of Bilga İshbara Tamgan Tarkan.
3. Bilge Yabghu Tun Apa Yigen Chor (𐰉𐰄𐰞𐰏𐰅 𐰖𐰀𐰉𐰏𐰎 𐰆 𐱃𐰆𐰣 𐰀𐰯𐰀 𐰖𐰄𐰏𐰅𐰣 𐰕𐰎𐰗𐰺) (? - 753 ) – Relative of Özmiş Khagan, submitted to Uyghur Khagan following the destruction of the Second Turkic Khaganate.
4. Tun Bilge Yabghu (𐱃𐰆𐰣 𐰉𐰄𐰞𐰏𐰅 𐰖𐰀𐰉𐰏𐰎𐰆) (753 –? ) – Son of Bilge Yabghu.
5. Yigen Chor? (𐰘𐰃𐰏𐰤𐰲𐰆𐰺) – Might be the same person as Tun Bilge.
6. Unknown Yabghu – Karluk Yabghu were mentioned in the Turkic religious book 'Iki Jïltïz Nom'. His identity remains unknown.
7. Inal Tegin (𐰄𐰣𐰀𐰞 𐱃𐰅𐰏𐰄𐰣 𐰚𐰎𐰀𐰏𐰀𐰣) (8th century) – Known from coins.
8. Köbäk – Known as 'βγy xr’lwγ x’γ’n pny' in Sogdian, meaning 'Karluk Kaghan Köbak.' Belonged to the Arslanids of Ashina.
9. Arslan Kul Erkin – Belonged to the 'Arslanid' branch of Ashina dynasty, hence the name. Their relation to Arslanid dynasty of Chigils is unknown. Known from coins.
10. Bilge Kul Qadır Khan (Karakhanid language: کُلْ بِلْكا قَادِرْ خَانْ) (? – 893) – Following the destruction of Uyghur Khaganate, he declared himself Khagan and founded the Kara-Khanid Khanate.

== Anikova dish ==
The Anikova dish is a Nestorian Christian plate with decoration of a besieged Jericho, by Sogdian artists under Karluk dominion, in Semirechye. It is dated to the 8th century, of which an ast silver of the 9th-10th century is known, copied from an original.

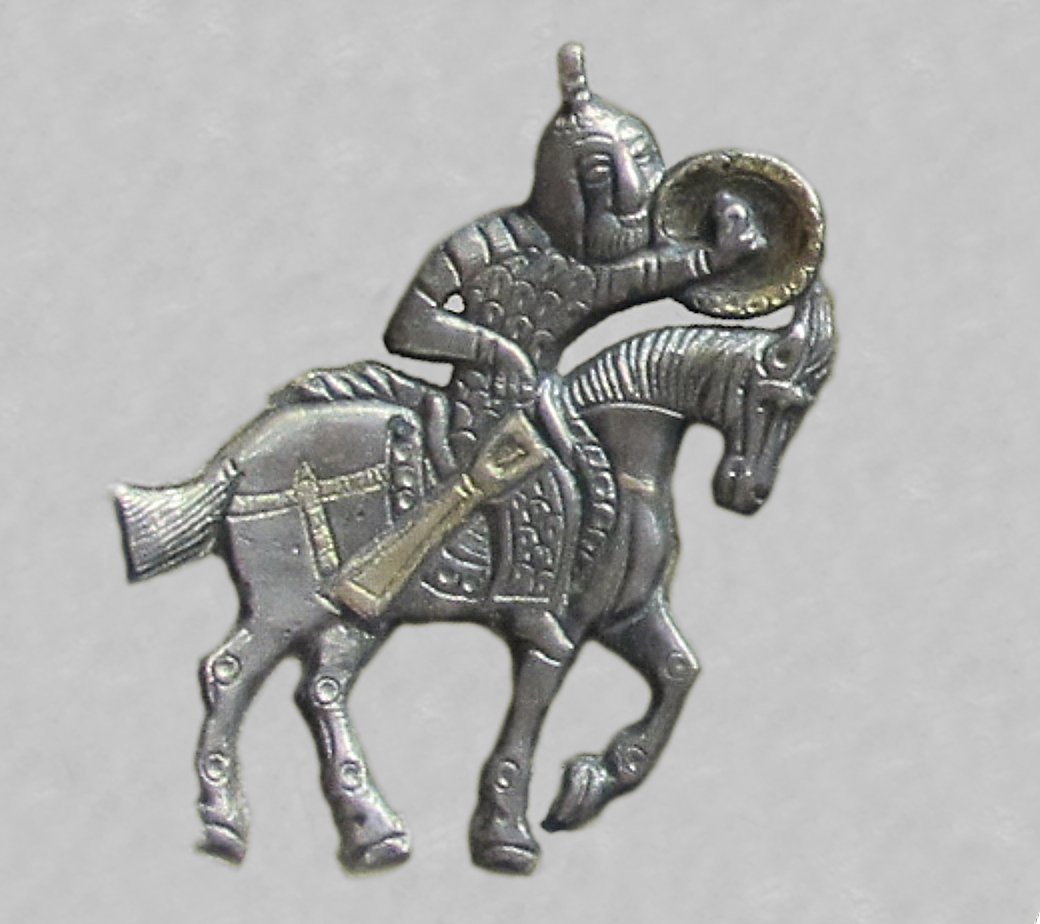
Anikova dish horseman, Semirechye, c. 800 CE design.

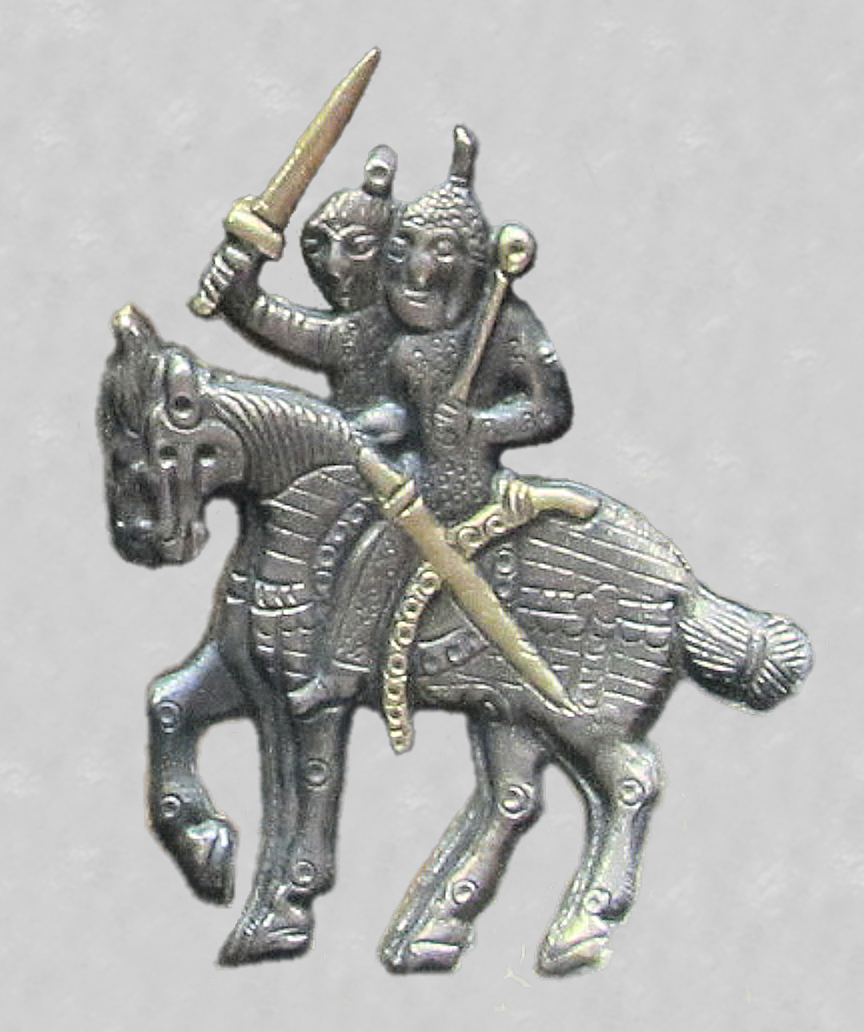
Anikova dish, two horsemen, Semirechye, c. 800 CE design.

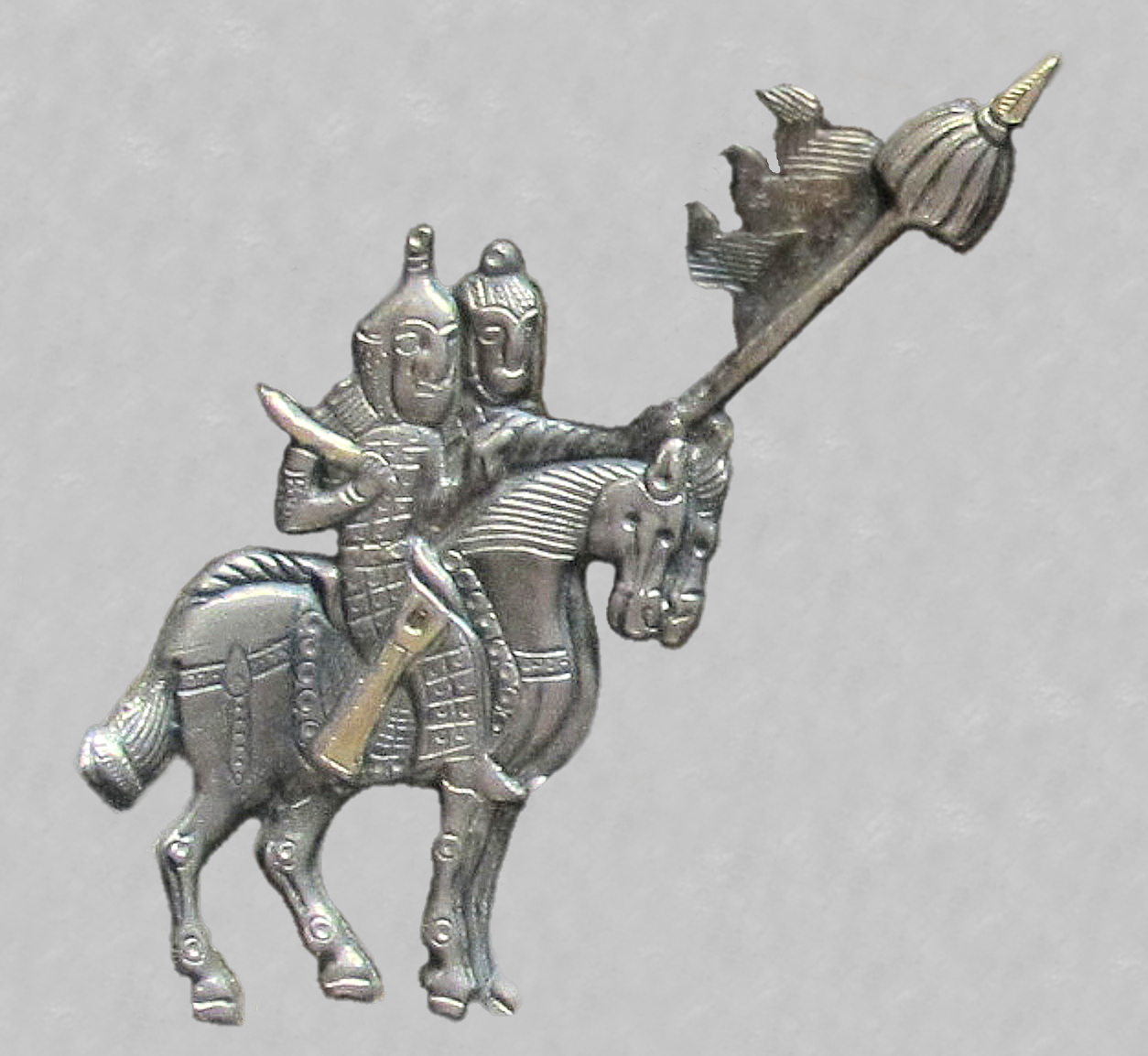
Anikova dish, two horsemen with banner, Semirechye, c. 800 CE design.

== See also ==
- Oghuz Yabgu State
- Turkic peoples
- Timeline of Turks (500-1300)
