= Yabghu =

State office in the early Turkic states, roughly equivalent to viceroy

Yabghu (Old Turkic: 𐰖𐰉𐰍𐰆, romanized: yabɣu, simplified Chinese: 叶护; traditional Chinese: 葉護; pinyin: Yèhù), also rendered as jabgu, djabgu or yabgu, was a title in early Turkic states, roughly equivalent to viceroy. The title carried autonomy in different degrees, and its links with the central authority of khagan varied from economical and political subordination to superficial political deference. The title had also been borne by Turkic princes in the upper Oxus region in post-Hephthalite times.

The position of yabghu was traditionally given to the second highest ranking member of a ruling clan, with the first highest ranking being the kagan. Frequently, the yabghu was a younger brother of the ruling khagan, or a representative of the next generation, called shad (blood prince). Mahmud Kashgari defined the title as "position two steps below Kagan", listing the heir apparent as a step above yabghu.

As the khaganate decentralized, the yabghu gained more autonomous power within it, and historical records name a number of independent states with "yabghu" being the title of the supreme ruler. One prominent example was the Oghuz Yabgu State in Middle Asia, which was formed after the fragmentation of the Second Turkic Khaganate in the 740s. Another prominent example was the Karluk Yabghu, the head of the Karluks which, in the 766, occupied Suyab in the Jeti-su area, and eventually grew into a powerful Karakhanid state.

== Etymology ==
There are at least several proposals regarding the origin of yabghu:

- Yabghu might be a derivation from native Turkic root *yap- "to do, to carry out; to come nearer to help" and so might mean "the assistant (of the khagan)".
- Others suggest that the word is a derivation of the early Turkic davgu; however, the d /ð/ to y /j/ sound change happened late (e.g. not before Sui period (561–618).
- It is believed by some scholars to be of Kushan (Chinese: Guishuang 貴霜) political tradition, borrowed by the Göktürks from an Indo-European language, and preserved by the Hephtalites. For example, Harold Bailey reconstructs *yavuka ~ *yāvuka, which means "gatherer of troops" or "troop-leader" and is from base yau-, yū-, and yu- "to bring together", cognate with Avestan yavayeiti, yūta and Old Indian yú- "companion" and yūthá- "group";
- Others, such as Sims-Williams, considered that the word yabghu in Turkic languages had been borrowed from Old Chinese i̯əp-g’u > xīhóu, rendered in Chinese characters as 翕侯 or 翖侯 Conversely, Friedrich Hirth suggested that yabghu was transcribed literary Chinese, with regard to Kushan and Turkic contexts, as *xiap-g’u > xīhóu. It was equivalent to the title yavugo found on Kushan coins from Kabul, and the yabghu on ancient Turkic monuments. The second part of this compound Chinese word, hou ("g’u"), referred to the second-ranking of five hereditary noble ranks. Chinese sources do not make clear whether the title was a descriptive term used only in reference to foreign leaders, or whether it indicated an ally or subject of a Chinese empire;
- Another theory postulates a Sogdian origin for both titles, "yabghu" and "shad". The rulers of some Sogdian principalities are known to have title "Ikhshid";
- Yury Zuev considered yabghu to be a "true Tocharian" title.

== See also ==
- Tokhara Yabghus
