= Tuhsi =

Medieval Turkic-speaking tribe

The Tuhsis were a medieval Turkic-speaking tribe, who lived alongside the Chigil, Yagma, and other tribes, in Zhetysu and today southern Kazakhstan.

== Origins ==
Tuhsi were considered remnants of the Türgesh people. Turkologist Yury Zuev noted a nation (國) named 觸水昆 (Mand. Chùshuǐkūn < *t͡ɕʰɨok̚-ɕˠiuɪ^{X}-kuən) in Jiu Tangshu, so he reconstructed 觸水昆 as *Tuhsi-kun; however, Nurlan Kenzheakhmet noted that Tongdian's authors transcribed the same ethnonym as 觸木昆 (Mand. Chùmùkūn < *t͡ɕʰɨok̚-muk̚-kuən), the name of a Duolu Turk tribe, also transcribed as 處木昆 (Chǔmùkūn < t͡ɕʰɨʌ^{X}-muk̚-kuən).

It's unclear whether the ethnonym Tuhsi is of Turkic origin. Tuhsi may be connected to Cuman clan Toqsoba, if Toqsoba did not derive from Common Turkic toquz "nine" and oba "clan". (Note: e.g. Hungarian Turkologist Imre Baski suggested that the element Toqs in Toqsoba could mean "plump leather bottle") Hungarian orientalist Karoly Czeglédy compares the name Tuhsi to that of a medieval Eastern Iranian-speaking Alano-As tribe Duχs-Aṣ, located in the North Caucasus by ibn Rustah, and proposes that Tuhsis had been of Iranian-speaking As origins. (Note: Alternatively, D.hsās might be a scribal error for *Ruḫs-Ās, who were possibly connected to the Roxolani.)

== Culture ==
By the 11-century, Tuhsis led a nomadic lifestyle amongst the Turkic peoples and on the steppe, possessed a Turkic culture, and their language belonged to the Turkic language family. According to Karakhanid lexicographer Mahmud of Kashgar, contemporary Tuhsis were Turkic-speaking monoglots; after carefully analyzing linguistic materials collected from Tuhsi dialect, he praised the Tuhsi Turkic dialect, among others, for being "pure" and "most correct", both in terms of accent and vocabulary.
