= Turkic peoples =

Family of ethnic groups of Eurasia

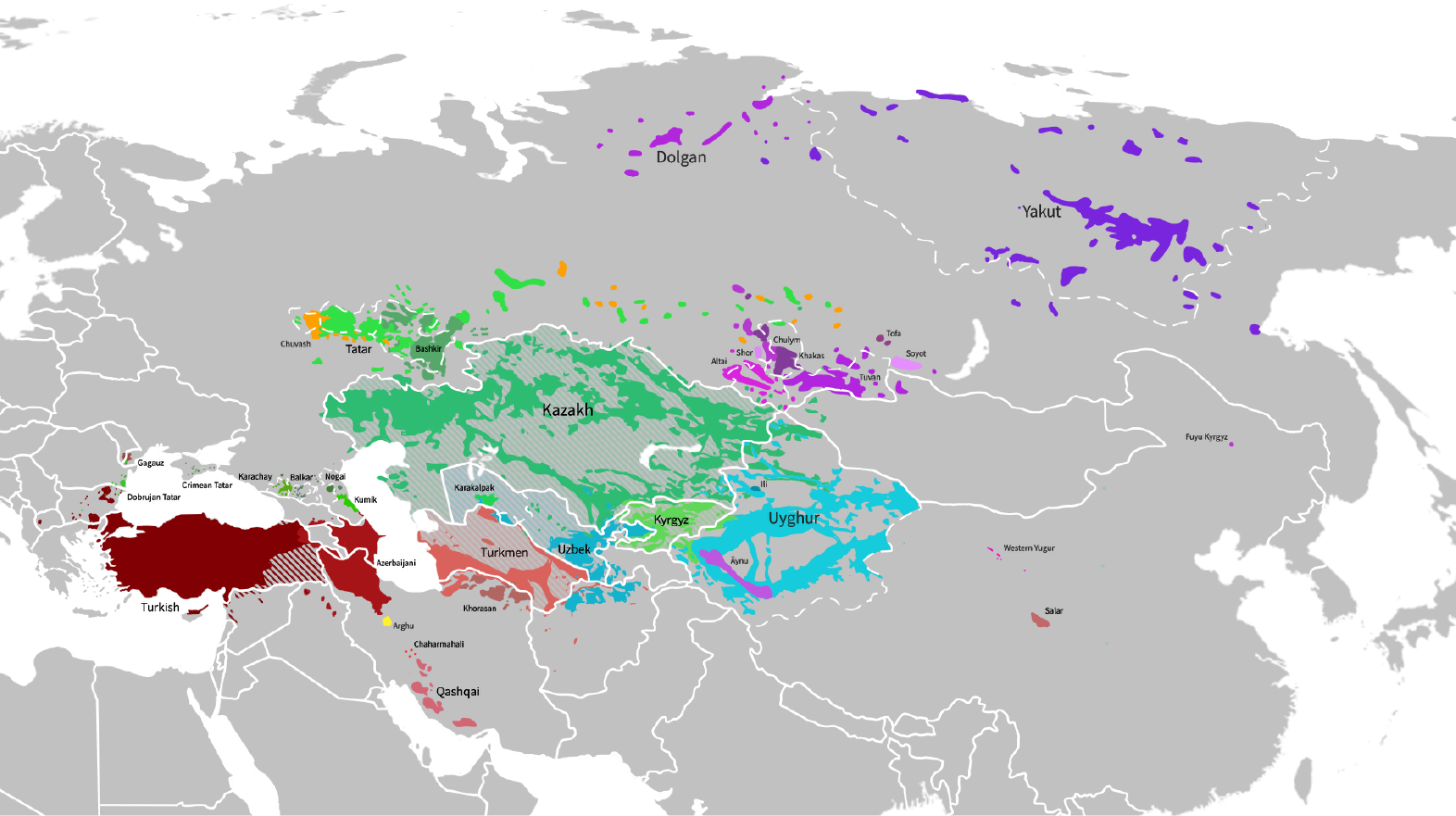
- The distribution of the Turkic languages

Total population
- Over 170 million

Regions with significant populations
- Turkey: 60,000,000–65,000,000
- Uzbekistan: 31,900,000
- Iran: 15,000,000–20,000,000 (18% of population)
- Russia: 12,751,502
- Kazakhstan: 12,300,000
- China: 13,500,000
- Azerbaijan: 10,000,000
- European Union: 5,876,318 (Bulgaria 508,375)
- Afghanistan: 4,600,000–5,300,000 (2017)
- Turkmenistan: 4,233,600 (Note: Figure combines population of Turkmen and Uzbeks only. Population estimates of Turkmenistan's minority groups often widely vary. Some sources have cast doubt on the reliability of official government data for minority population figures.)
- Kyrgyzstan: 4,500,000 (2014)–6,397,500 (2022)
- Iraq: 3,000,000
- Tajikistan: 1,200,000
- Syria: 800,000–1,000,000+
- Ukraine: 398,600
- Northern Cyprus: 313,626
- Mongolia: 135,618
- Lebanon: 200,000
- Moldova: 126,010
- North Macedonia: 81,900

Languages
- Turkic languages

Religion
- Mostly Islam (Sunni · Shia); Minorities: Irreligious · Christianity · Buddhism · Judaism · Turkic shamanism (Tengrism)

Turkic peoples are a collection of diverse ethnic groups of West, Central, East, and North Asia as well as parts of Europe, who speak Turkic languages.

According to historians and linguists, the Proto-Turkic language originated in Central-East Asia, potentially in the Altai-Sayan region, Mongolia or Tuva. Initially, Proto-Turkic speakers were potentially both hunter-gatherers and farmers; they later became nomadic pastoralists. Early and medieval Turkic groups exhibited a wide range of both East Asian and West Eurasian physical appearances and genetic origins, in part through long-term contact with neighboring peoples such as Iranic, Mongolic, Tocharian, Uralic and Yeniseian peoples.

Many vastly differing ethnic groups have throughout history become part of the Turkic peoples through language shift, acculturation, conquest, intermixing, adoption, and religious conversion. Nevertheless, Turkic peoples share, to varying degrees, non-linguistic characteristics like cultural traits, ancestry from a common gene pool, and historical experiences. Some of the most notable modern Turkic ethnic groups include the Altai people, Azerbaijanis, Chuvash people, Gagauz people, Kazakhs, Kyrgyz people, Turkmens, Turkish people, Tuvans, Uyghurs, Uzbeks, and Yakuts.

== Etymology ==
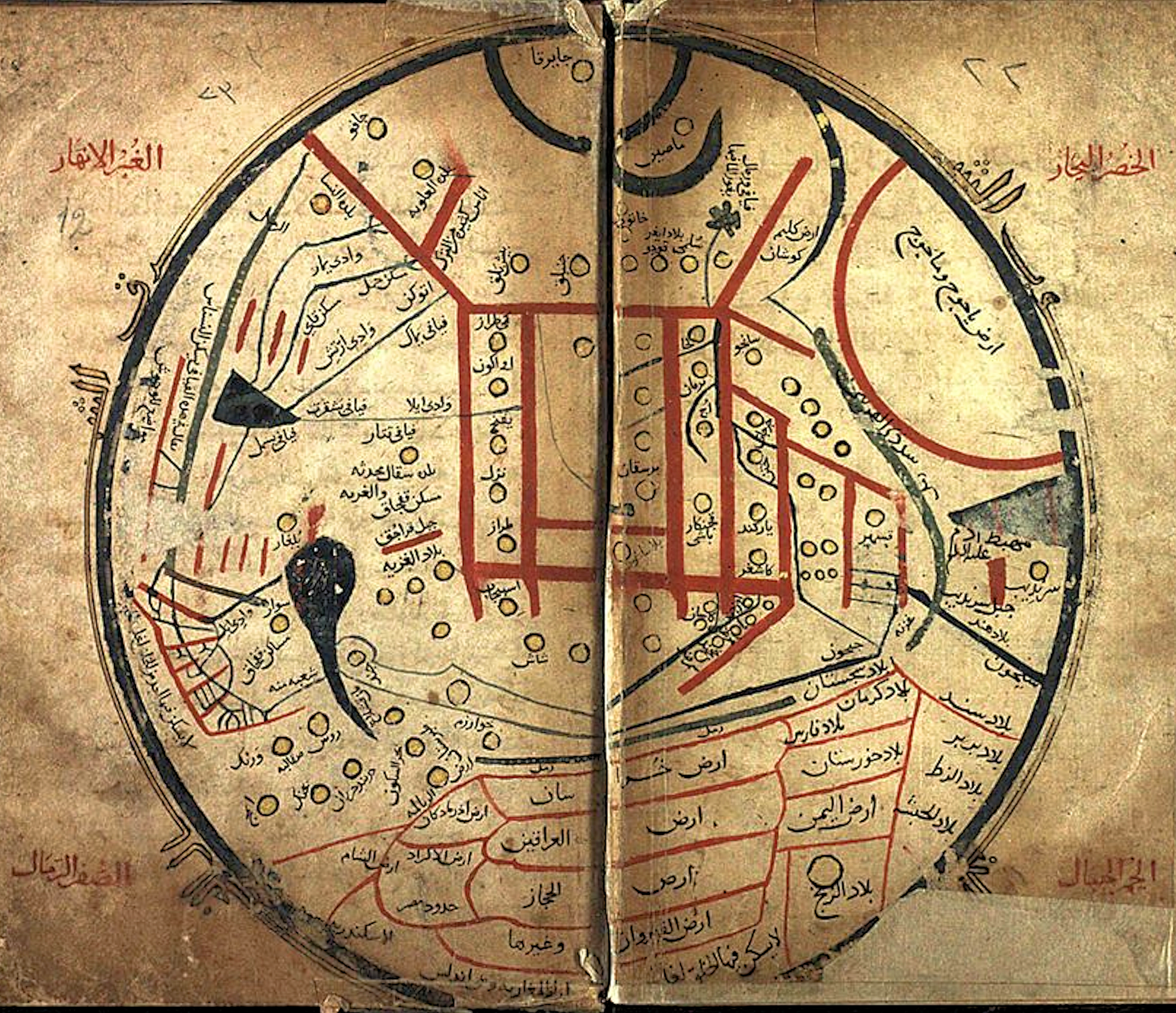
Map from Kashgari's Diwan (11th century), showing the distribution of Turkic tribes.

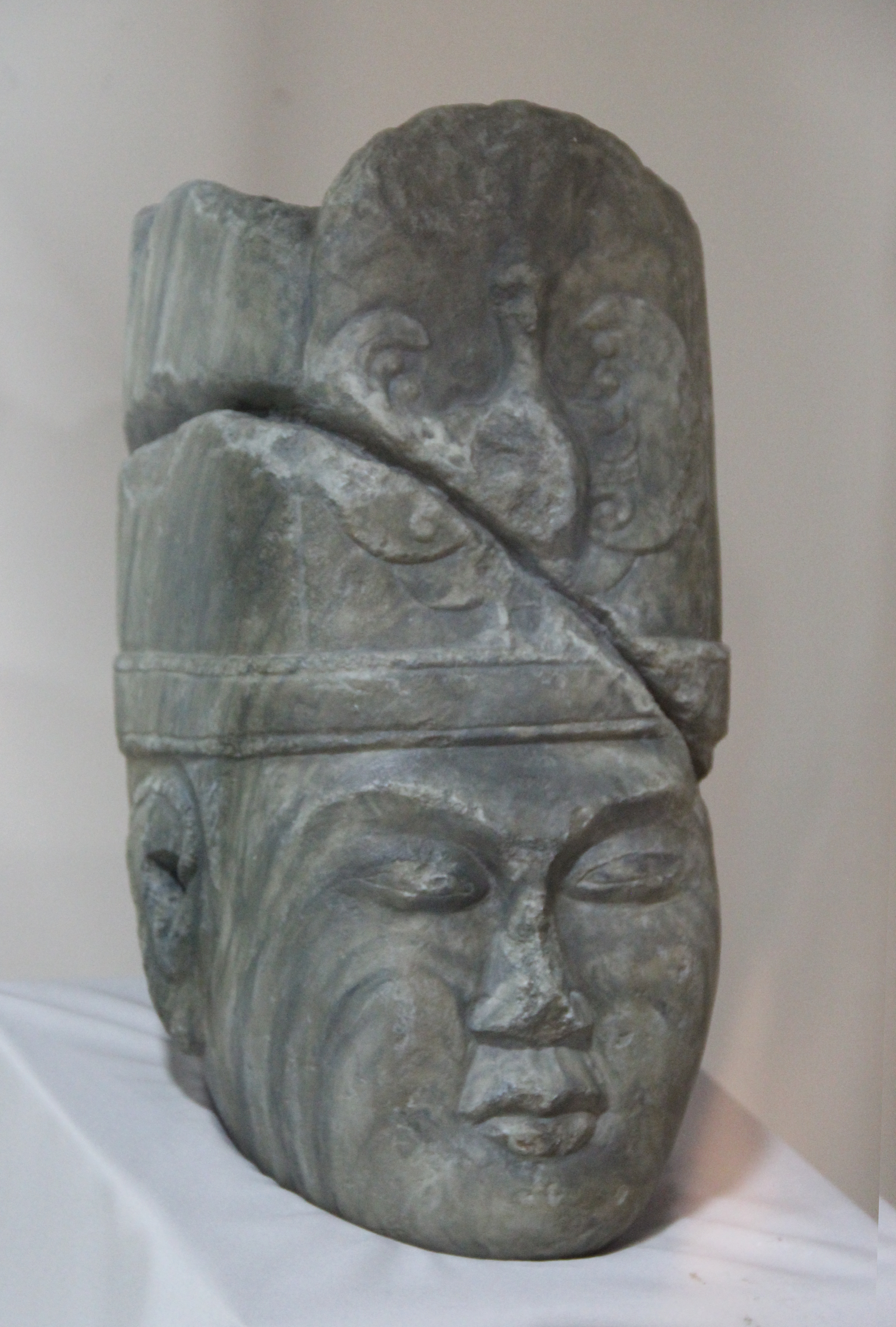
Bust of Kul Tigin (AD 684–731), prince of the Second Turkic Khaganate, found in Khashaat, Arkhangai Province, Orkhon River valley. National Museum of Mongolia.

The first known mention of the term Turk (Old Turkic: 𐱅𐰇𐰼𐰰 Türük or 𐱅𐰇𐰼𐰰:𐰜𐰇𐰛 Kök Türük, Chinese: 突厥; pinyin: Tūjué < Middle Chinese *tɦut-kyat < *dwət-kuɑt, Old Tibetan: drugu) applied to only one Turkic group, namely, the Göktürks, who were also mentioned, as türüg ~ török, in the 6th-century Khüis Tolgoi inscription, most likely not later than 587 AD. A letter by Ishbara Qaghan to Emperor Wen of Sui in 585 described him as "the Great Turk Khan". The Bugut (584 CE) and Orkhon inscriptions (735 CE) use the terms Türküt, Türk and Türük.

During the first century CE, Pomponius Mela refers to the Turcae in the forests north of the Sea of Azov, and Pliny the Elder lists the Tyrcae among the people of the same area. However, English archaeologist Ellis Minns contended that Tyrcae Τῦρκαι is "a false correction" for Iyrcae Ἱύρκαι, a people who dwelt beyond the Thyssagetae, according to Herodotus (Histories, iv. 22), and were likely Ugric ancestors of Magyars. There are references to certain groups in antiquity whose names might have been foreign transcriptions of Tür(ü)k, such as Togarma, Turukha/Turuška, Turukku and so on; but the information gap is so substantial that any connection of these ancient people to the modern Turks is not possible.

The Chinese Book of Zhou (7th century) presents an etymology of the name Turk as derived from 'helmet', explaining that this name comes from the shape of a mountain where they worked in the Altai Mountains. Hungarian scholar András Róna-Tas (1991) pointed to a Khotanese-Saka word, tturakä 'lid', semantically stretchable to 'helmet', as a possible source for this folk etymology, yet Golden thinks this connection requires more data.

It is generally accepted that the name Türk is ultimately derived from the Old-Turkic migration-term 𐱅𐰇𐰼𐰰 Türük/Törük, which means 'created, born' or 'strong'. Turkologist Peter B. Golden agrees that the term Turk has roots in Old Turkic, yet is not convinced by attempts to link Dili, Dingling, Chile, Tele, and Tiele, which possibly transcribed *tegrek (probably meaning 'cart'), to Tujue, which transliterated to Türküt.

Scholars, including Toru Haneda, Onogawa Hidemi, and Geng Shimin believed that Di, Dili, Dingling, Chile and Tujue all came from the Turkic word Türk, which means 'powerful' and 'strength', and its plural form is Türküt. Even though Gerhard Doerfer supports the proposal that türk means 'strong' in general, Gerard Clauson points out that "the word türk is never used in the generalized sense of 'strong'" and that türk was originally a noun and meant "'the culminating point of maturity' (of a fruit, human being, etc.), but more often used as an [adjective] meaning (of a fruit) 'just fully ripe'; (of a human being) 'in the prime of life, young, and vigorous'". Hakan Aydemir (2022) also contends that Türk originally did not mean "strong, powerful" but "gathered; united, allied, confederated" and was derived from the Pre-Proto-Turkic verb *türü "heap up, collect, gather, assemble".

The earliest Turkic-speaking peoples identifiable in Chinese sources are the Yenisei Kyrgyz and Xinli, located in South Siberia. (Note: The Xueyantuo were first known as Xinli 薪犁, later Xue 薛 in the 7th century; the Yenisei Kyrgyz were first known as Gekun (鬲昆) or Jiankun (堅昆), later known as Jiegu (結骨), Hegu (紇骨), Hegusi (紇扢斯), Hejiasi (紇戛斯), Hugu (護骨), Qigu (契骨), Juwu (居勿), and Xiajiasi (黠戛斯), all being transcriptions of Kyrgyz.) Another example of an early Turkic population would be the Dingling.

In Late Antiquity itself, as well as in the Middle Ages, the name "Scythians" was used in Greco-Roman and Byzantine literature for various groups of nomadic "barbarians" living on the Pontic-Caspian Steppe who were not related to the actual Scythians. Medieval European chroniclers subsumed various Turkic peoples of the Eurasian steppe as "Scythians". Between 400 CE and the 16th century, Byzantine sources use the name Σκύθαι (Skuthai) in reference to twelve different Turkic peoples.

In the modern Turkish language as used in the Republic of Turkey, a distinction is made between "Turks" and the "Turkic peoples" in loosely speaking: the term Türk corresponds specifically to the "Turkish-speaking" people (in this context, "Turkish-speaking" is considered the same as "Turkic-speaking"), while the term Türki refers generally to the people of modern "Turkic Republics" (Türki Cumhuriyetler or Türk Cumhuriyetleri). However, the proper usage of the term is based on the linguistic classification in order to avoid any political sense. In short, the term Türki can be used for Türk or vice versa.

== List of ethnic groups ==
List of modern Turkic peoples
Ethnonym	Population	Region(s)	Religion
Turks	60,000,000–65,000,000	Turkey, Northern Cyprus	Sunni Islam, Alevism
Azerbaijanis	31,300,000	Azerbaijan (Iran), Azerbaijan, Dagestan (Russian Federation)	Shia Islam, Sunni Islam
Uzbeks	30,700,000	Uzbekistan	Sunni Islam
Kazakhs	15,193,000	Kazakhstan, (Mongolia) Bayan-Ölgii, (China) Ili Kazakh Autonomous Prefecture, Barköl Kazakh Autonomous County, Mori Kazakh Autonomous County, Altai	Sunni Islam
Uyghurs	11,900,000	(China) Xinjiang Uyghur Autonomous Region (PRC)	Sunni Islam
Turkmens	8,000,000	Turkmenistan	Sunni Islam
Volga Tatars	6,200,000	Tatarstan (Russian Federation)	Sunni Islam, Orthodox Christianity
Kyrgyz	6,000,000	Kyrgyzstan, (China) Kizilsu Kyrgyz Autonomous Prefecture	Sunni Islam
Bashkirs	1,700,000	Bashkortostan (Russian Federation)	Sunni Islam
Chuvashes	1,500,000	Chuvashia (Russian Federation)	Orthodox Christianity, Vattisen Yaly
Khorasani Turks	1,000,000	N/A	Shia Islam
Qashqai	949,000	N/A	Shia Islam
Karakalpaks	796,000	Karakalpakstan (Uzbekistan)	Sunni Islam
Kumyks	520,000	Dagestan (Russian Federation)	Sunni Islam
Crimean Tatars	<500,000	Crimea (Ukraine)	Sunni Islam
Yakuts (Sakha)	482,000	Sakha Republic or Yakutia (Russian Federation)	Orthodox Christianity, Tengrism
Karachays	346,000	Karachay-Cherkessia (Russian Federation)	Sunni Islam
Tuvans	273,000	Tuva (Russian Federation)	Tibetan Buddhism, Tengrism
Gagauz	126,000	Gagauzia (Moldova)	Orthodox Christianity
Balkars	112,000	Kabardino-Balkaria (Russian Federation)	Sunni Islam
Nogais	110,000	Dagestan and Karachay-Cherkessia (Russian Federation)	Sunni Islam
Salar	104,000	(China) Xunhua Salar Autonomous County, Jishishan Bonan, Dongxiang and Salar Autonomous County	Sunni Islam, Tibetan Buddhism
Khakas	75,000	Khakassia (Russian Federation)	Orthodox Christianity, Tengrism
Altaians	74,000	Altai (Russian Federation)	Burkhanism, Tengrism, Orthodox Christianity
Äynu	>60,000	N/A	Alevism
Khalaj	42,000	N/A	Shia Islam
Yugurs	13,000	(China) Sunan Yugur Autonomous County	Tibetan Buddhism, Tengrism
Dolgans	13,000	Taymyrsky Dolgano-Nenetsky District (Russian Federation)	Tengrism, Orthodox Christianity
Khotons	10,000	N/A	Sunni Islam
Nağaybäk	8,000	N/A	Orthodox Christianity
Shors	8,000	N/A	Orthodox Christianity, Tengrism
Siberian Tatars	6,000	N/A	Sunni Islam
Telengits	3,700	N/A	Orthodox Christianity, Burkhanism, shamanism
Soyots	3,600	N/A	Tibetan Buddhism, Tengrism
Kumandins	2,900	N/A	Orthodox Christianity, Tengrism
Teleuts	2,700	N/A	Orthodox Christianity, Tengrism
Crimean Karaites	2,000	N/A	Karaite Judaism
Tubalar	1,900	N/A	Orthodox Christianity, shamanism
Fuyu Kyrgyz	1,400	N/A	Sunni Islam
Chelkans	1,100	N/A	Orthodox Christianity, Burkhanism, shamanism
Krymchaks	1,000	N/A	Orthodox Judaism
Tofalars	800	N/A	Tengrism, Orthodox Christianity
Chulyms	355	N/A	Orthodox Christianity
Dukha	282	N/A	Tengrism
Ili Turks	177	N/A	Sunni Islam

Historical Turkic groups

- Az
- Dingling
- Bulgars
- Esegel
- Barsils
- Alat
- Basmyl
- Onogurs
- Saragurs
- Sabirs
- Shatuo
- Ongud (from Shatuo)
- Göktürks
- Oghuz Turks
- Kanglys
- Kabar
- Khazars
- Kipchaks
- Kurykans
- Kumans
- Pechenegs
- Karluks
- Tiele
- Turgesh
- Tukhsi
- Yenisei Kirghiz
- Chigils
- Toquz Oghuz
- Orkhon Uyghurs
- Yagma
- Nushibi
- Duolu
- Kutrigurs
- Utigurs
- Yabaku
- Yueban (Note: Book of Wei vol. 102. quote: "悅般國 [...] 其風俗言語與高車同" translation: "Yueban nation [...] Their customs and language are the same as the Gaoche['s]"; Gaoche (高車; lit. "High-Carts") was another name of the Turkic-speaking Tiele)
- Bulaqs
- Xueyantuo
- Torks
- Chorni Klobuky
- Berendei
- Yemeks
- Naimans (partly)
- Keraites (partly)
- Merkits (partly) (Note: Merkits were always counted as a part of the Mongols within the Mongol Empire, however, some scholars proposed additional Turkic ancestry for Merkits; Christopher P. Atwood – Encyclopedia of Mongolia and the Mongol Empire ISBN 978-0-8160-4671-3, Facts on File, Inc. 2004.)
- Uriankhai (partly) (Note: Refers to forest peoples of the North, including the Turkic-speaking Tuvans and Yakuts, and also Mongolic-speaking Altai Uriankhai. The ethnonym Uriankhai is etymologically Mongolic, compare Khalkha uria(n) "war motto" and khai, alternation of khan. Uriankhai people are possibly linked to the Wuluohun tribe of the Shiwei people, who were predominantly Mongolic-speaking.)

These groups were of possible Proto-Turkic ancestry, the Tuoba and Rouran, who were of Proto-Mongolic Donghu ancestry. as well as Tatars, Rourans' supposed descendants. (Note: Even though Chinese historians routinely ascribed Xiongnu origin to various nomadic peoples, such ascriptions do not necessarily indicate the subjects' exact origins; for examples, Xiongnu ancestry was ascribed to Turkic-speaking Göktürks and Tiele as well as Para-Mongolic-speaking Kumo Xi and Khitan.)

== Language ==
=== Distribution ===
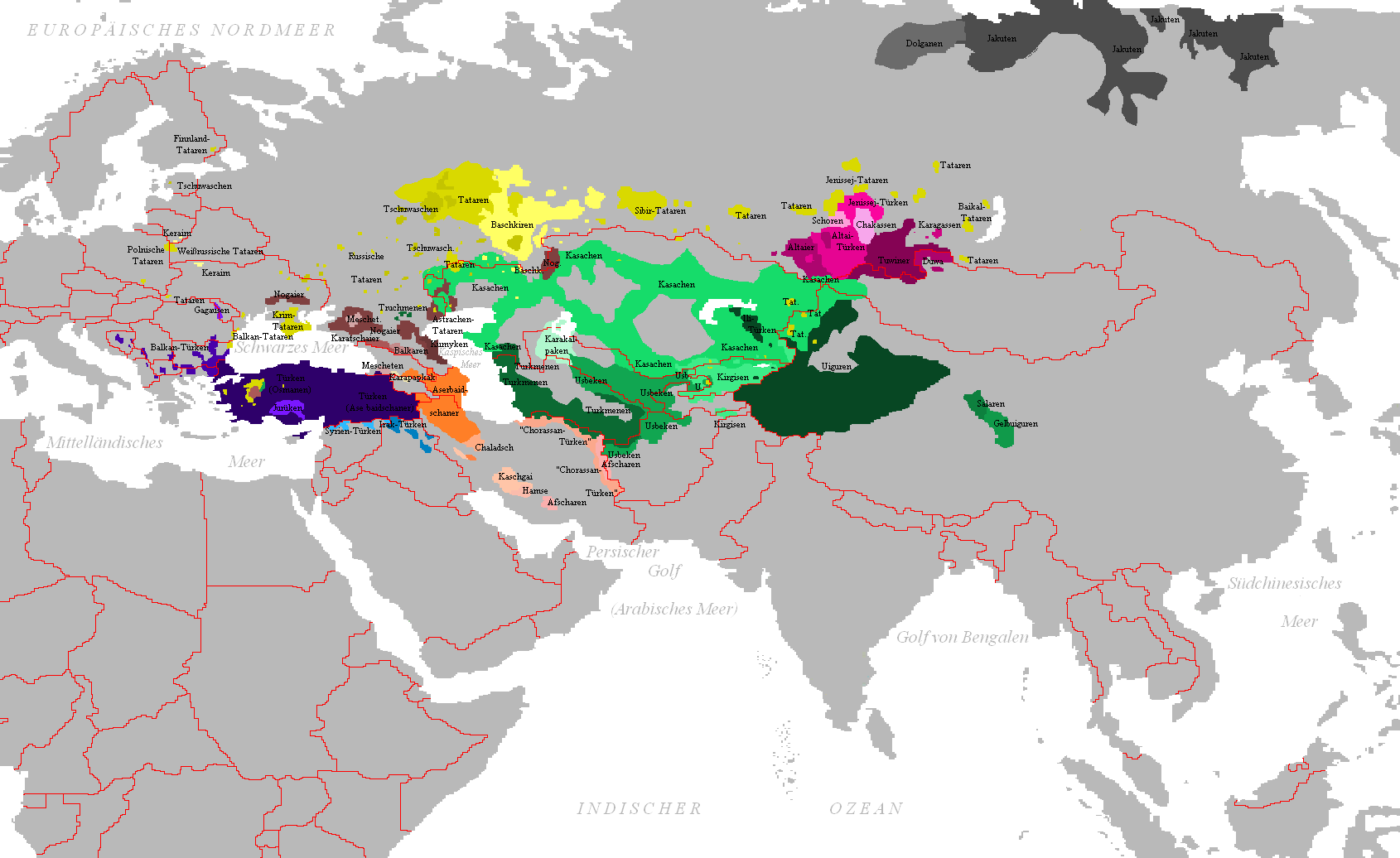
Descriptive map of Turkic peoples.

The Turkic languages constitute a language family of some 30 languages, spoken across a vast area from Eastern Europe and the Mediterranean, to Siberia and Manchuria and through to the Middle East. Some 170 million people have a Turkic language as their native language; an additional 20 million people speak a Turkic language as a second language. The Turkic language with the greatest number of speakers is Turkish proper, or Anatolian Turkish, the speakers of which account for about 40% of all Turkic speakers. More than one third of these are ethnic Turks of Turkey, dwelling predominantly in Turkey proper and formerly Ottoman-dominated areas of Southern and Eastern Europe and West Asia; as well as in Western Europe, Australia and the Americas as a result of immigration. The remainder of the Turkic people are concentrated in Central Asia, Russia, the Caucasus, China, and northern Iraq.

The Turkic language family was traditionally considered to be part of the proposed Altaic language family. Howeover since the 1950s, a majority of linguists have rejected the proposal, after supposed cognates were found not to be valid, hypothesized sound shifts were not found, and Turkic and Mongolic languages were found to be converging rather than diverging over the centuries. Opponents of the theory proposed that the similarities are due to mutual linguistic influences between the groups concerned.

=== Alphabet ===
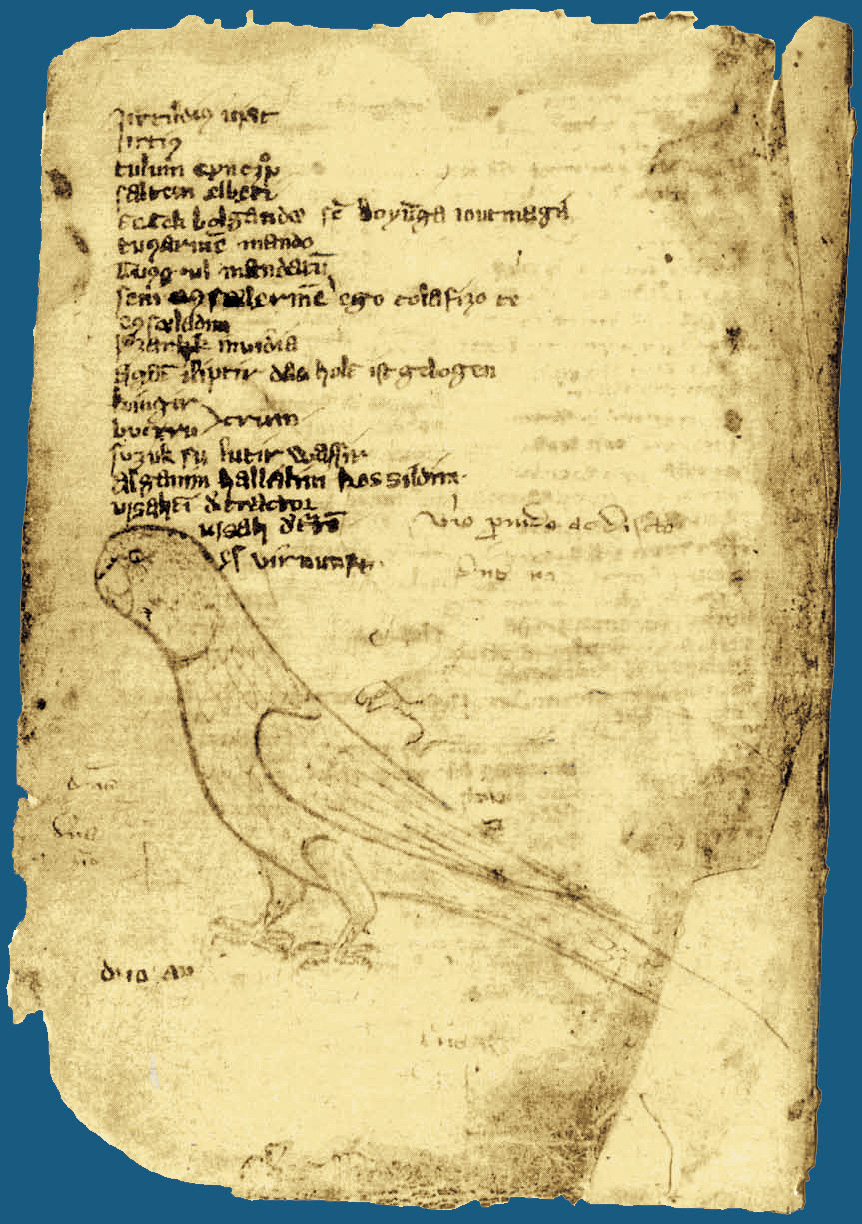
A page from "Codex Kumanicus". The Codex was designed in order to help Catholic missionaries communicate with the Kumans.

The Turkic alphabets are sets of related alphabets with letters (formerly known as runes), used for writing mostly Turkic languages. Inscriptions in Turkic alphabets were found in Mongolia. Most of the preserved inscriptions were dated to between 8th and 10th centuries CE.

The earliest positively dated and read Turkic inscriptions date from the 8th century, and the alphabets were generally replaced by the Old Uyghur alphabet in the East and Central Asia, Arabic script in the Middle and Western Asia, Cyrillic in Eastern Europe and in the Balkans, and Latin alphabet in Central Europe. The latest recorded use of Turkic alphabet was recorded in Central Europe's Hungary in 1699 CE.

The Turkic runiform scripts, unlike other typologically close scripts of the world, do not have a uniform palaeography as do, for example, the Gothic runiform scripts, noted for their exceptional uniformity of language and paleography. The Turkic alphabets are divided into four groups, the best known of which is the Orkhon version of the Enisei group. The Orkhon script is the alphabet used by the Göktürks from the 8th century to record the Old Turkic language. It was later used by the Uyghur Empire; a Yenisei variant is known from 9th-century Kyrgyz inscriptions, and it has likely cousins in the Talas Valley of Turkestan and the Old Hungarian script of the 10th century. Irk Bitig is the only known complete manuscript text written in the Old Turkic script.

== History ==
=== Origins ===
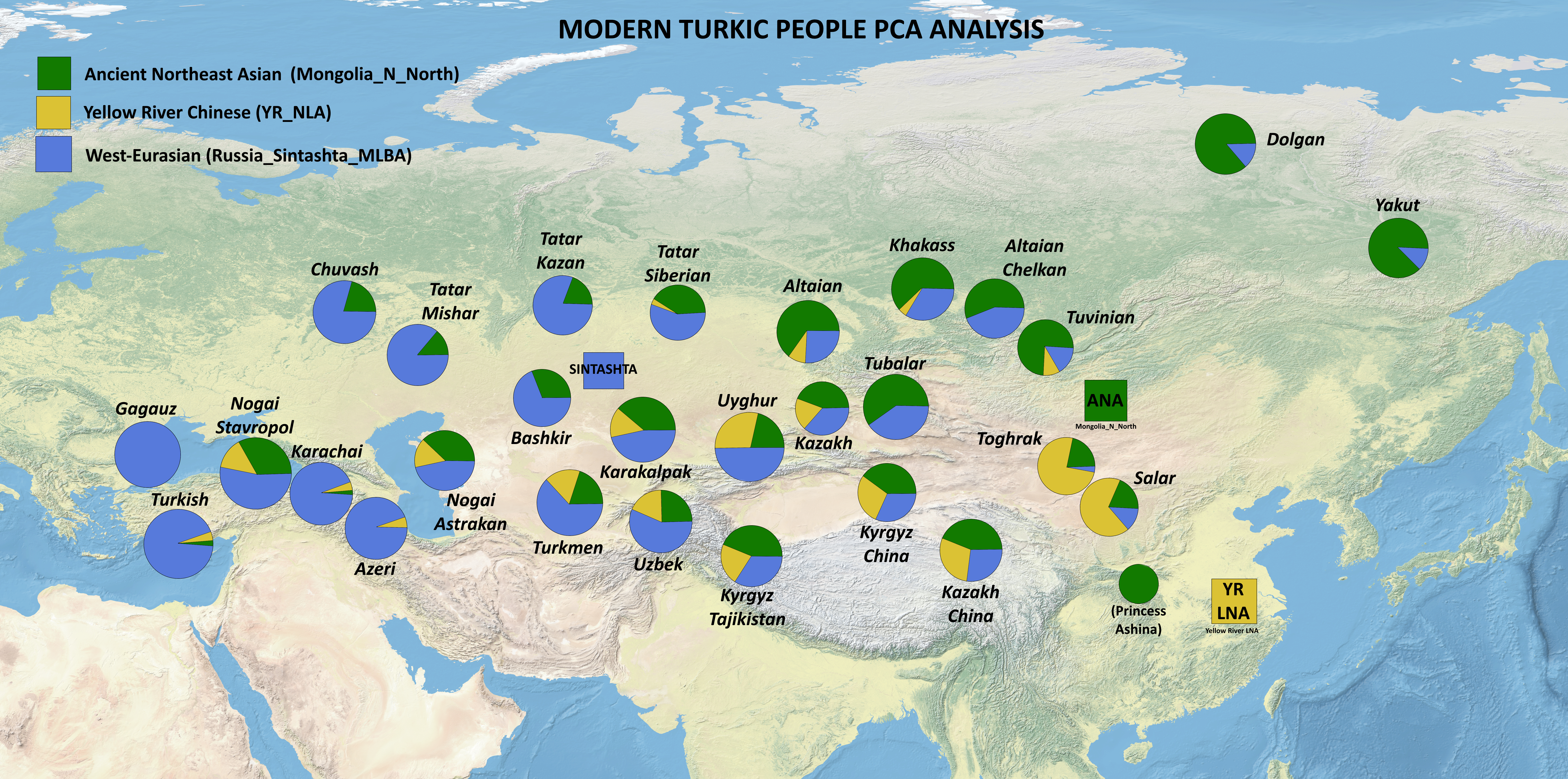
Ancestral composition of modern Turkic‐speaking populations based on supervised admixture, with modeled proportions of Ancient Northeast Asian ancestry (Mongolia_N_North and Ashina, ), as well as Chinese Central Plain millet farmers (YR_LN, ) and West Eurasian‐related ancestry (Russia_Sintashta_MLBA, ).

The origins of the Turkic peoples has been a topic of much discussion. Peter Benjamin Golden proposes two locations for the Proto-Turkic Urheimat: the southern Altai-Sayan region, and Southern Siberia, from Lake Baikal to eastern Mongolia. Other studies suggested an early presence of Turkic peoples in Mongolia, or Tuva.

A possible genealogical link of the Turkic languages to Mongolic and Tungusic languages, specifically a hypothetical homeland in the West Liao River Basin, such as proposed in the Transeurasian hypothesis, by Martine Robbeets, has received support but also criticism, with opponents attributing similarities to long-term contact. The proto-Turkic-speakers may be linked to Neolithic East Asian agricultural societies in Northeastern China, which is to be associated with the Xinglongwa culture and the succeeding Hongshan culture, based on varying degrees of specific East Asian genetic substratum among modern Turkic speakers. According to historians, "the Proto-Turkic subsistence strategy included an agricultural component, a tradition that ultimately went back to the origin of millet agriculture in Northeast China". This view is however questioned by other geneticists, who found no evidence for a shared "Neolithic Hongshan ancestry", but in contrary primary Ancient Northeast Asian (ANA) Neolithic ancestry from the Amur region, supporting an origin from Northeast Asia rather than agriculture-driven expansion from the West Liao River Basin. Nevertheless, the study "lacked more detailed robust evidence to conﬁrm the exact geographical locations" of their origins within Northeast Asia.

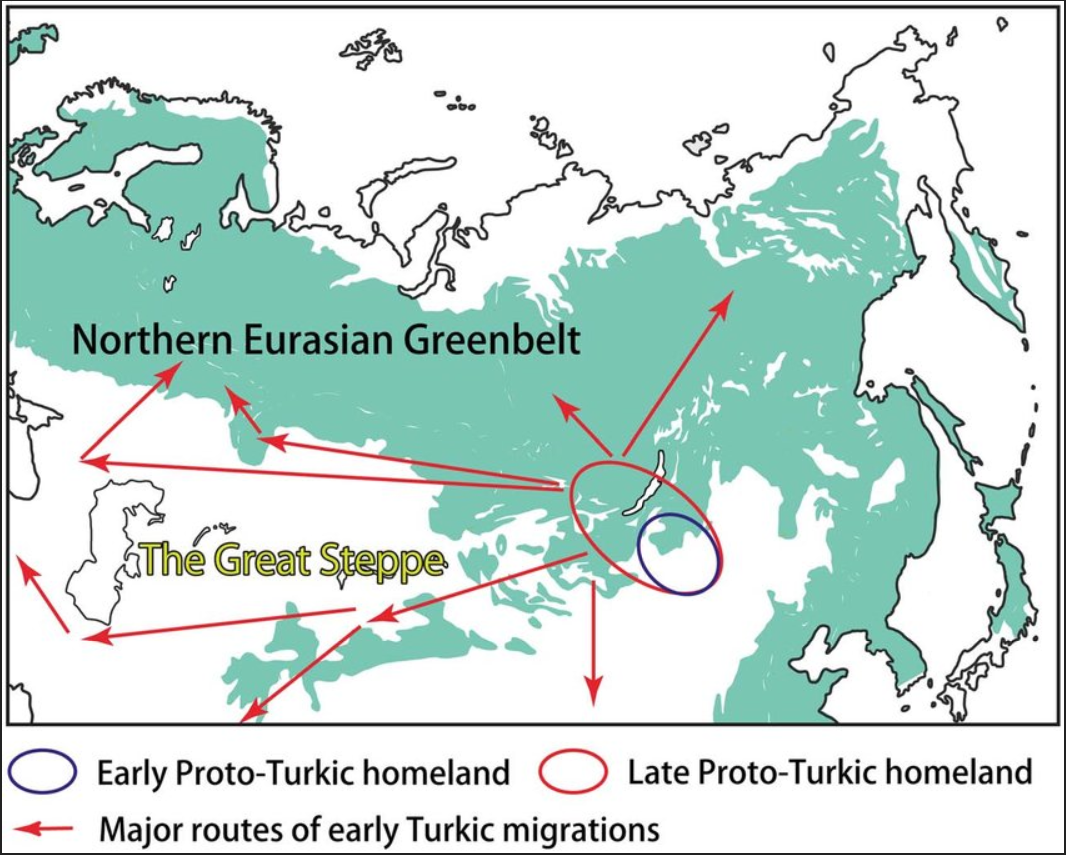
According to Uchiyama et al. 2020 the "ultimate Proto-Turkic homeland may have been located in a more compact area, most likely in Eastern Mongolia".

Around 1200 BC, the (hunter-gathering and semi-agricultural) ancestors of the Turkic peoples probably migrated westwards into the steppe of Mongolia, where they adopted a pastoral lifestyle, in part borrowed from Iranian peoples. Given nomadic peoples such as Xiongnu, Rouran and Xianbei share underlying genetic ancestry "that falls into or close to the northeast Asian gene pool", the proto-Turkic language likely originated in northeastern Asia, on the eastern fringes of the Northern Eurasian Greenbelt forest zone.

Genetic data found that almost all modern Turkic peoples retained at least some shared ancestry associated with populations in "South Siberia and Mongolia" (SSM), supporting this region as the "Inner Asian Homeland (IAH) of the pioneer carriers of Turkic languages" which subsequently expanded into Central Asia. The main Turkic expansion took place during the 5th–16th centuries, partially overlapping with the Mongol Empire period. Based on single-path IBD tracts, the common Turkic ancestral population lived prior to these migration events, and likely stem from a similar source population as Mongolic peoples further East. Historical data suggests that the Mongol Empire period acted as secondary force of "turkification", as the Mongol conquest "did not involve massive re-settlements of Mongols over the conquered territories. Instead, the Mongol war machine was progressively augmented by various Turkic tribes as they expanded, and in this way Turkic peoples eventually reinforced their expansion over the Eurasian steppe and beyond."

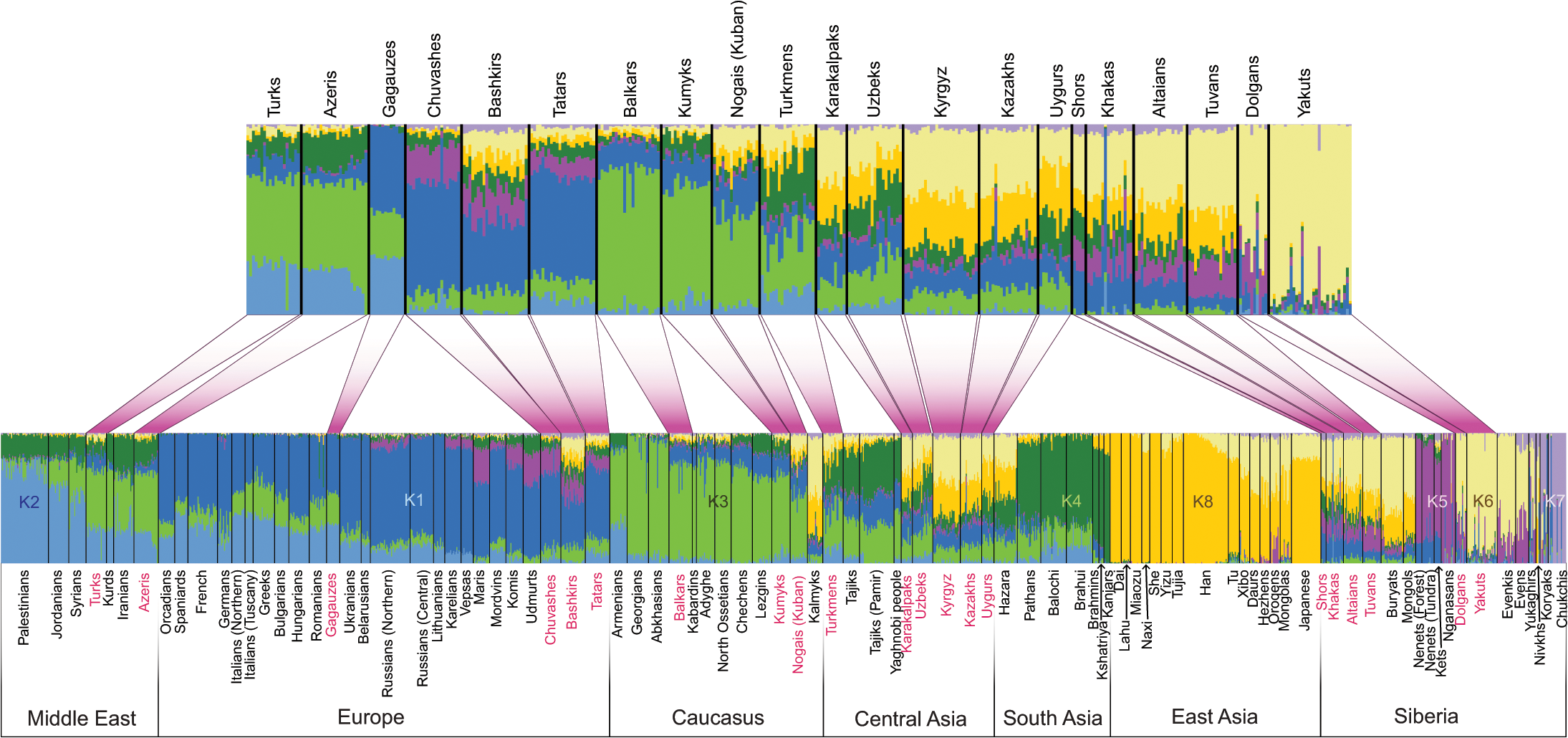
Population structure of Turkic-speaking populations in the context of their geographic neighbors across Eurasia. Turkic-speaking populations are shown in red. The upper barplot shows only Turkic-speaking populations.

There is increasing evidence for a partial continuity from the eastern Scythians to the Turkic-speakers of the Altai region. Turkic-speaking Central Asians can be described as having formed from mixture between Scythian-like groups, displaying their highest genetic affinity to modern-day Tajiks, and "Eastern Steppe Xiongnu" groups during the Iron Age.

A 2018 autosomal single-nucleotide polymorphism study suggested that the Eurasian Steppe slowly transitioned from Indo-European and Iranian-speaking groups with largely western Eurasian ancestry to increasing East Asian ancestry with Turkic and Mongolian groups in the past 4000 years, including extensive Turkic migrations out of Mongolia and slow assimilation of local populations. A 2022 report suggested that Turkic and Mongolic populations in Central Asia formed via admixture events during the Iron Age between "local Indo-Iranian and a South-Siberian or Mongolian group with a high East-Asian ancestry (around 60%)". Modern-day Turkmens form an outlier among Central Asian Turkic-speakers with a lower frequency of the Baikal component (c. 22%) and a lack of the Han-like component, being closer to other Indo-Iranian groups. A subsequent study in 2022 also found that the spread of Turkic-speaking populations into Central Asia happened after the spread of Indo-European speakers into the area. Another 2022 study found that all Altaic‐speaking (Turkic, Tungusic, and Mongolic) populations "were a mixture of dominant Siberian Neolithic ancestry and non-negligible YRB ancestry", suggesting their origins were somewhere in Northeast Asia, most likely the Amur River basin. Except Eastern and Southern Mongolic-speakers, all "possessed a high proportion of West Eurasian-related ancestry, in accordance with the linguistically documented language borrowing in Turkic languages". In regards to South Siberian Turkic-speaking groups, they share high genetic drift with the 'Cisbaikal_LNBA' population, who are characterized by high Ancient Paleo-Siberian ancestry. But they are also significantly shifted towards Inland Northeast Asians, represented by the Yumin individual, and are more related to present Yeniseians than Beringians.

A 2023 study analyzed the DNA of Empress Ashina (568–578 AD), a Royal Göktürk, whose remains were recovered from a mausoleum in Xianyang, China. The authors determined that Empress Ashina belonged to the North-East Asian mtDNA haplogroup F1d, and that approximately 96-98% of her autosomal ancestry was of Ancient Northeast Asian origin, while roughly 2-4% was of West Eurasian origin, indicating ancient admixture. This study weakened the "western Eurasian origin and multiple origin hypotheses". However, they also noted that "Central Steppe and early Medieval Türk exhibited a high but variable degree of West Eurasian ancestry, indicating there was a genetic substructure of the Türkic empire." The early medieval Türk samples were modelled as having 37.8% West Eurasian ancestry and 62.2% Ancient Northeast Asian ancestry and historic Central Steppe Türk samples were also an admixture of West Eurasian and Ancient Northeast Asian ancestry, while historic Karakhanid, Kipchak and the Turkic Karluk samples had 50.6%-61.1% West Eurasian ancestry and 38.9%–49.4% Iron Age Yellow River farmer ancestry. A 2020 study also found "high genetic heterogeneity and diversity during the Türkic and Uyghur periods" in the early medieval period in the Eastern Eurasian Steppe.

=== Early historical attestation ===
The earliest separate Turkic peoples, such as the Gekun (鬲昆) and Xinli (薪犁), appeared on the peripheries of the late Xiongnu confederation about 200 BCE (contemporaneous with the Chinese Han dynasty) and later among the Turkic-speaking Tiele as Hegu (紇骨) and Xue (薛).

The Tiele (also known as Gaoche 高車, lit. "High Carts"), may be related to the Xiongnu and the Dingling. According to the Book of Wei, the Tiele people were the remnants of the Chidi (赤狄), the red Di people competing with the Jin in the Spring and Autumn period. Historically they were established after the 6th century BCE.

The Tiele were first mentioned in Chinese literature from the 6th to 8th centuries. Some scholars (Haneda, Onogawa, Geng, etc.) proposed that Tiele, Dili, Dingling, Chile, Tele, & Tujue all transliterated underlying Türk; however, Golden proposed that Dili, Dingling, Chile, Tele, and Tiele transliterated Tegrek while Tujue transliterated Türküt, plural of Türk. The appellation Türük (Old Turkic: 𐱅𐰇𐰼𐰰) ~ Türk (OT: 𐱅𐰇𐰼𐰚) (whence Middle Chinese 突厥 *dwət-kuɑt > *tɦut-kyat > standard Chinese: Tūjué) was initially reserved exclusively for the Göktürks by Chinese, Tibetans, and even the Turkic-speaking Uyghurs. In contrast, medieval Muslim writers, including Turkic speakers like Ottoman historian Mustafa Âlî and explorer Evliya Çelebi as well as Timurid scientist Ulugh Beg, often viewed Inner Asian tribes, "as forming a single entity regardless of their linguistic affiliation" commonly used Turk as a generic name for Inner Asians (whether Turkic- or Mongolic-speaking). Only in modern era do modern historians use Turks to refer to all peoples speaking Turkic languages, differentiated from non-Turkic speakers.

According to some researchers (Duan, Xue, Tang, Lung, Onogawa, etc.) the later Ashina tribe descended from the Tiele confederation. The Tiele however were probably one of many early Turkic groups, ancestral to later Turkic populations. However, according to Lee & Kuang (2017), Chinese histories do not describe the Ashina and the Göktürks as descending from the Dingling or the Tiele confederation.

==== Xiongnu (3rd c. BCE – 1st c. CE) ====
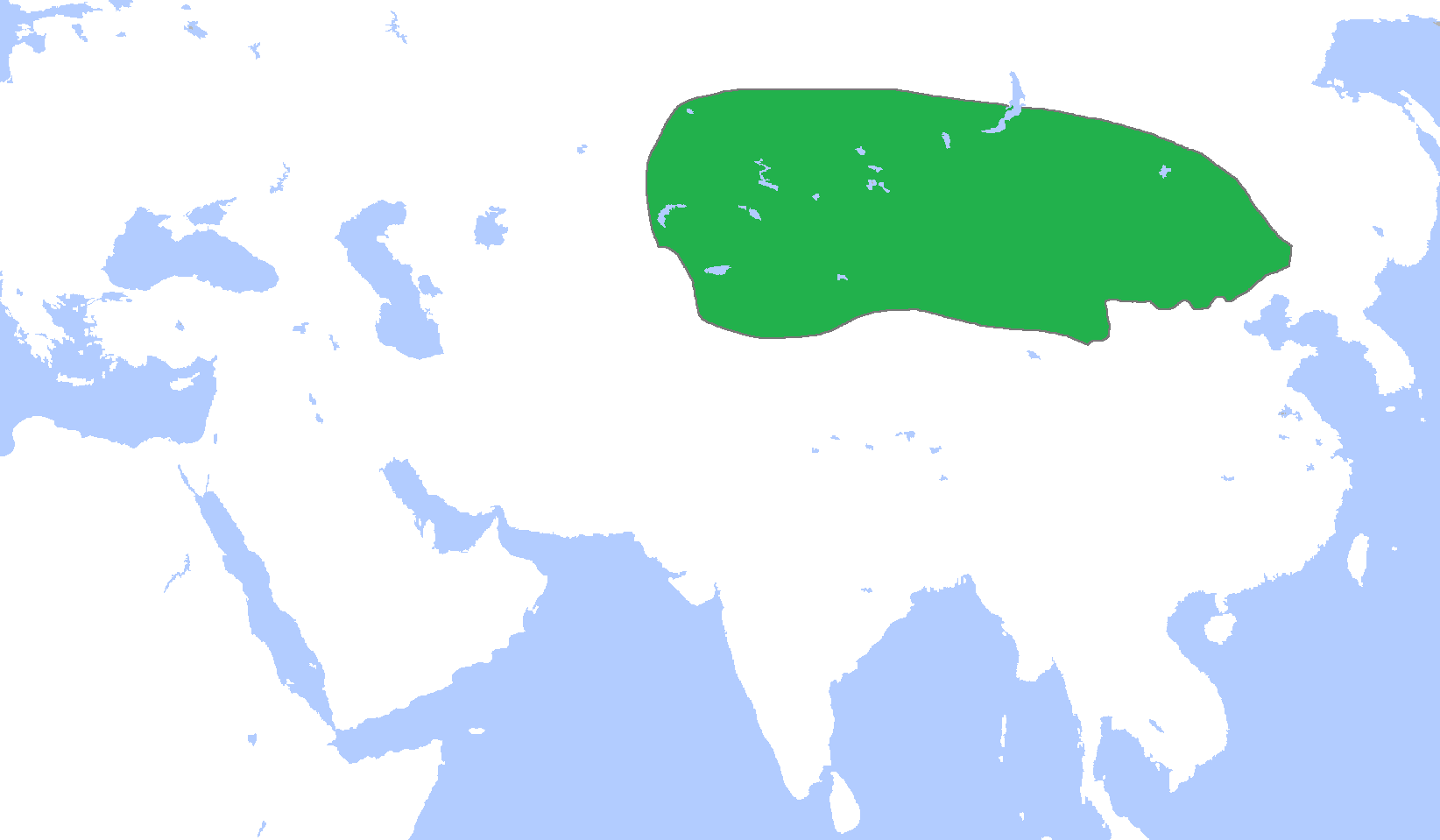
Territory of the Xiongnu, which included Mongolia, Western Manchuria, Xinjiang, East Kazakhstan, East Kyrgyzstan, Inner Mongolia, and Gansu.

It has even been suggested that the Xiongnu themselves, who were mentioned in Han dynasty records, were Proto-Turkic speakers. The Turks may ultimately have been of Xiongnu descent. Although little is known for certain about the Xiongnu language(s), it seems likely that at least a considerable part of Xiongnu tribes spoke a Turkic language. Some scholars believe they were probably a confederation of various ethnic and linguistic groups. According to a study by Alexander Savelyev and Choongwon Jeong, published in 2020 in the journal Evolutionary Human Sciences by Cambridge University Press, "the predominant part of the Xiongnu population is likely to have spoken Turkic". However, genetic studies found a mixture of western and eastern Eurasian ancestries, suggesting a large genetic diversity within the Xiongnu. The Turkic-related component may be brought by eastern Eurasian genetic substratum.

Using the only extant possibly Xiongnu writings, the rock art of the Yinshan and Helan Mountains, some scholars argue that the older Xiongnu writings are precursors to the earliest known Turkic alphabet, the Orkhon script. Petroglyphs of this region dates from the 9th millennium BCE to the 19th century, and consists mainly of engraved signs (petroglyphs) and few painted images. Excavations done during 1924–1925 in Noin-Ula kurgans located in the Selenga River in the northern Mongolian hills north of Ulaanbaatar produced objects with over 20 carved characters, which were either identical or very similar to the runic letters of the Turkic Orkhon script discovered in the Orkhon Valley.

=== Steppe expansions ===
==== Göktürks – Turkic Khaganate (5th–8th c.) ====
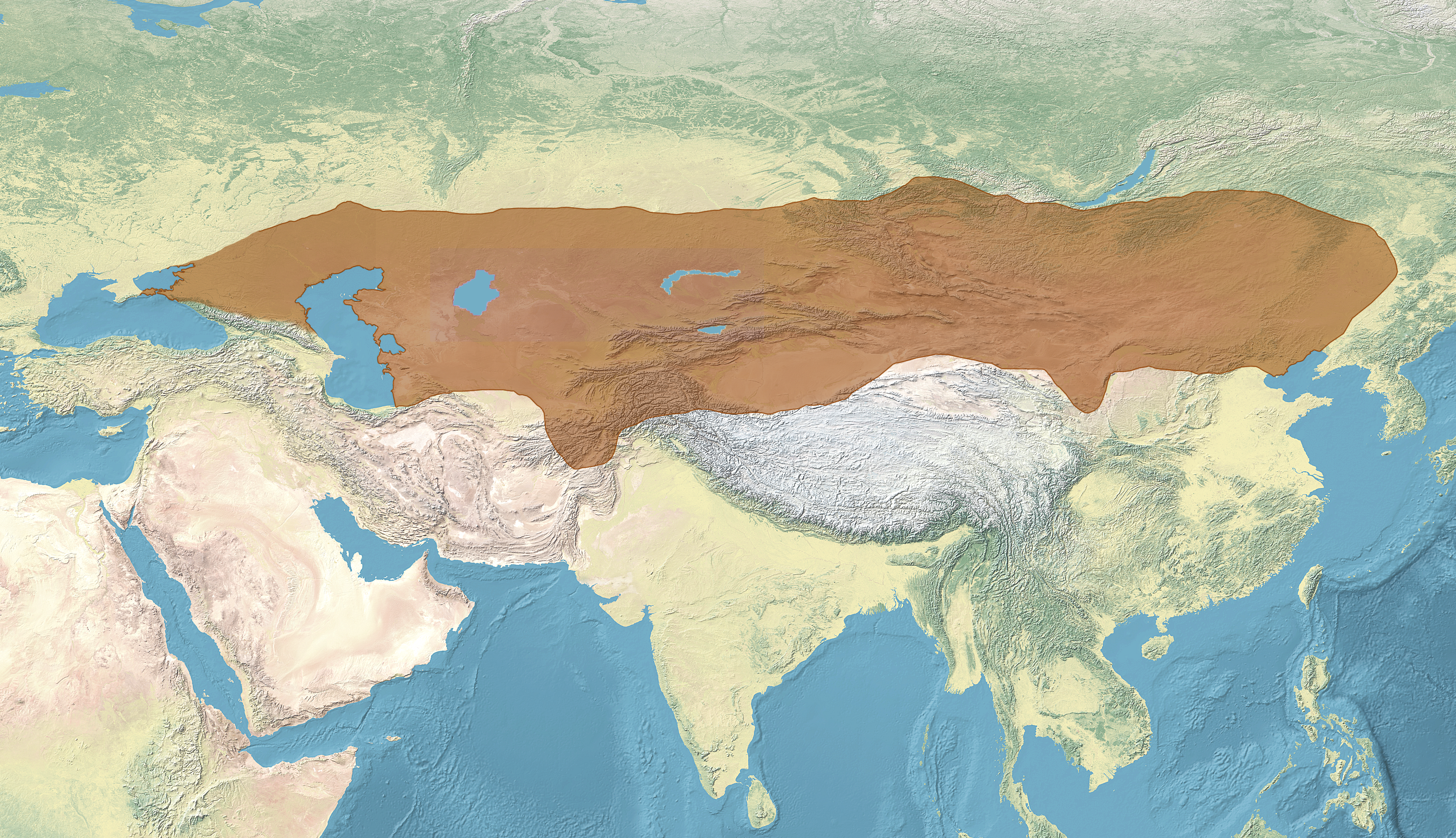
The First Turkic Khaganate at its greatest extent, in 576, with neighbouring contemporary polities.

The earliest certain mentioning of the politonym "Turk" was in the Chinese Book of Zhou. In the 540s AD, this text mentions that the Turks came to China's border seeking silk goods and a trade relationship. A Sogdian diplomat represented China in a series of embassies between the Western Wei dynasty and the Turks in the years 545 and 546.

According to the Book of Sui and the Tongdian, they were "mixed barbarians" (雜胡; záhú) who migrated from Pingliang (now in modern Gansu province, China) to the Rourans seeking inclusion in their confederacy and protection from the prevailing dynasty. Alternatively, according to the Book of Zhou, History of the Northern Dynasties, and New Book of Tang, the Ashina clan was a component of the Xiongnu confederation. Göktürks were also posited as having originated from an obscure Suo state (索國), north of the Xiongnu. The Ashina tribe were famed metalsmiths and were granted land south of the Altai Mountains (金山 Jinshan), which looked like a helmet, from which they were said to have gotten their name 突厥 (Tūjué), the first recorded use of "Turk" as a political name. In the 6th-century, Ashina's power had increased such that they conquered the Tiele on their Rouran overlords' behalf and even overthrew Rourans and established the First Turkic Khaganate.

The original Old Turkic name Kök Türk derives from kök ~ kö:k, "sky, sky-coloured, blue, blue-grey". Unlike its Xiongnu predecessor, the Göktürk Khaganate had its temporary Khagans from the Ashina clan, who were subordinate to a sovereign authority controlled by a council of tribal chiefs. The Khaganate retained elements of its original animistic- shamanistic religion, that later evolved into Tengriism, although it received missionaries of Buddhist monks and practiced a syncretic religion. The Göktürks were the first Turkic people to write Old Turkic in a runic script, the Orkhon script. The Khaganate was also the first state known as "Turk". It eventually collapsed due to a series of dynastic conflicts, but many states and peoples later used the name "Turk".

The Göktürks (First Turkic Kaganate) quickly spread west to the Caspian Sea. Between 581 and 603 the Western Turkic Khaganate in Kazakhstan separated from the Eastern Turkic Khaganate in Mongolia and Manchuria during a civil war. The Han-Chinese successfully overthrew the Eastern Turks in 630 and created a military Protectorate until 682. After that time the Second Turkic Khaganate ruled large parts of the former Göktürk area. After several wars between Turks, Chinese and Tibetans, the weakened Second Turkic Khaganate was replaced by the Uyghur Khaganate in the year 744.

==== Bulgars, Golden Horde and the Siberian Khanate ====
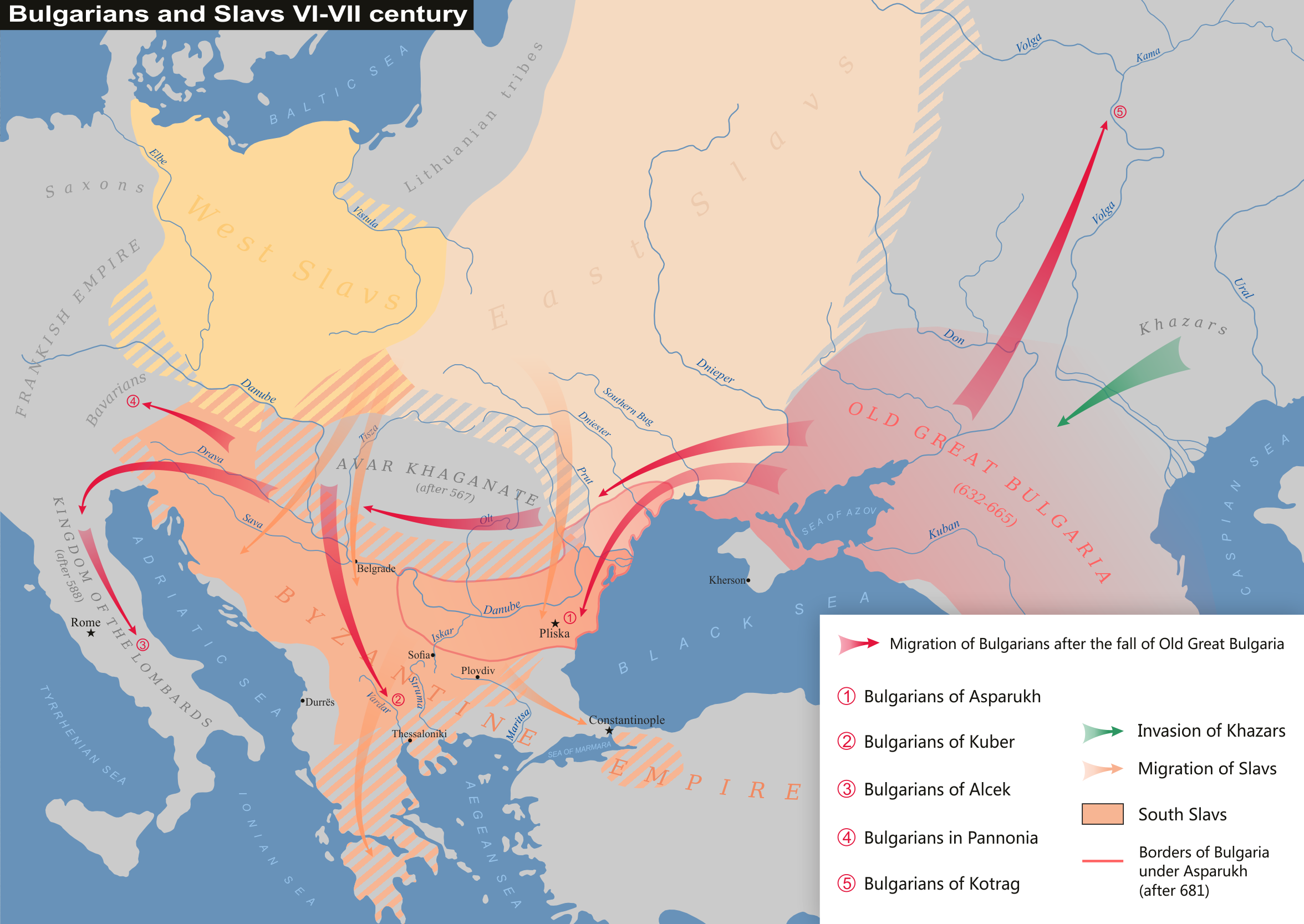
The migration of the Bulgars after the fall of Old Great Bulgaria in the 7th century

The Bulgars established themselves in between the Caspian and Black Seas in the 5th and 6th centuries, followed by their conquerors, the Khazars who converted to Judaism in the 8th or 9th century. After them came the Pechenegs who created a large confederacy, which was subsequently taken over by the Cumans and the Kipchaks. One group of Bulgars settled in the Volga region and mixed with local Volga Finns to become the Volga Bulgars in what is today Tatarstan. These Bulgars were conquered by the Mongols following their westward sweep under Ogedei Khan in the 13th century. Other Bulgars settled in Southeastern Europe in the 7th and 8th centuries, and mixed with the Slavic population, adopting what eventually became the Slavic Bulgarian language. Everywhere, Turkic groups mixed with the local populations to varying degrees.

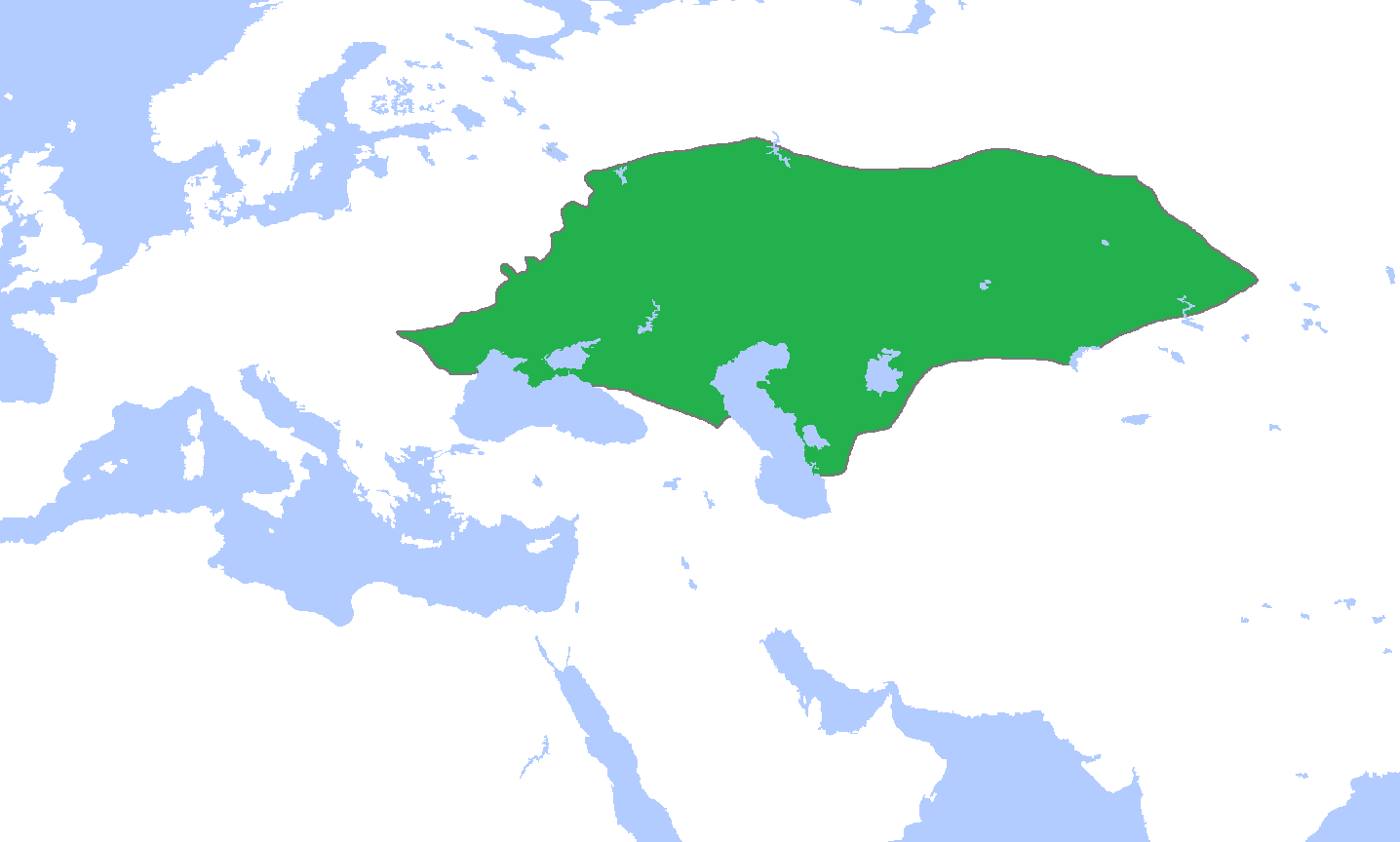
Golden Horde

The Volga Bulgaria became an Islamic state in 922 and influenced the region as it controlled many trade routes. In the 13th century, Mongols invaded Europe and established the Golden Horde in Eastern Europe, western and northern Central Asia, and even western Siberia. The Cuman-Kipchak Confederation and Islamic Volga Bulgaria were absorbed by the Golden Horde in the 13th century; in the 14th century, Islam became the official religion under Uzbeg Khan where the general population (Turks) as well as the aristocracy (Mongols) came to speak the Kipchak language and were collectively known as "Tatars" by Russians and Westerners. This country was also known as the Kipchak Khanate and covered most of what is today Ukraine, as well as the entirety of modern-day southern and eastern Russia (the European section). The Golden Horde disintegrated into several khanates and hordes in the 15th and 16th century including the Crimean Khanate, Khanate of Kazan, and Kazakh Khanate (among others), which were one by one conquered and annexed by the Russian Empire in the 16th through 19th centuries.

In Siberia, the Siberian Khanate was established in the 1490s by fleeing Tatar aristocrats of the disintegrating Golden Horde who established Islam as the official religion in western Siberia over the partly Islamized native Siberian Tatars and indigenous Uralic peoples. It was the northernmost Islamic state in recorded history and it survived up until 1598 when it was conquered by Russia.

==== Uyghur Khaganate (8th–9th c.) ====
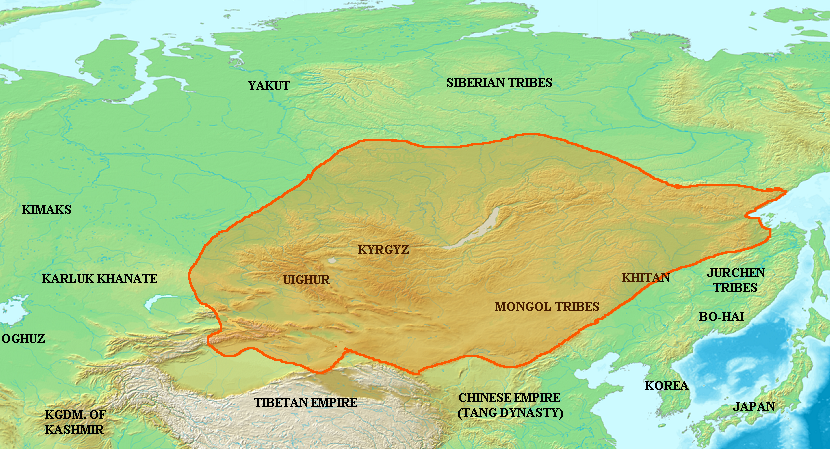
Uyghur Khaganate

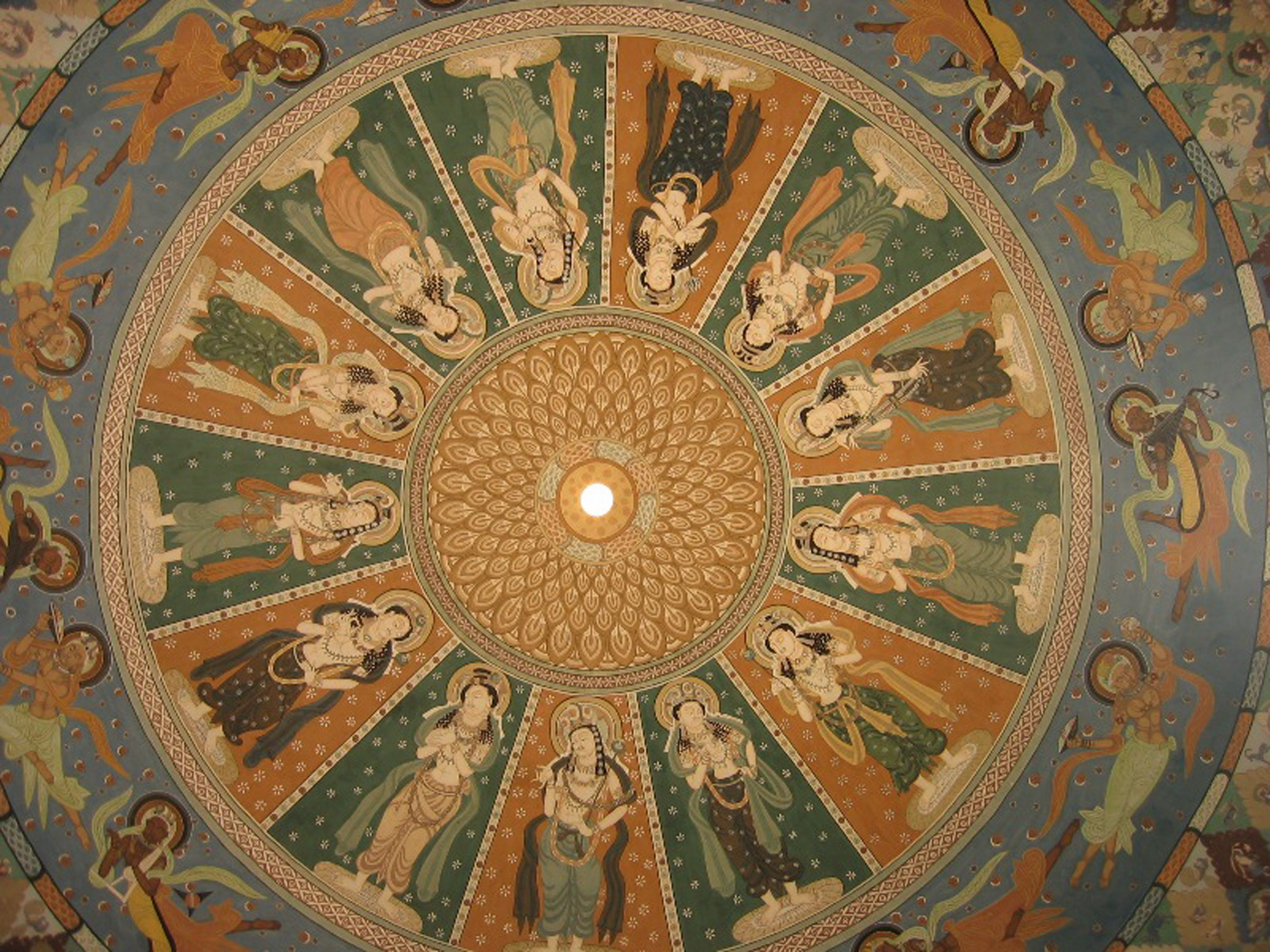
Uyghur painting from the Bezeklik murals

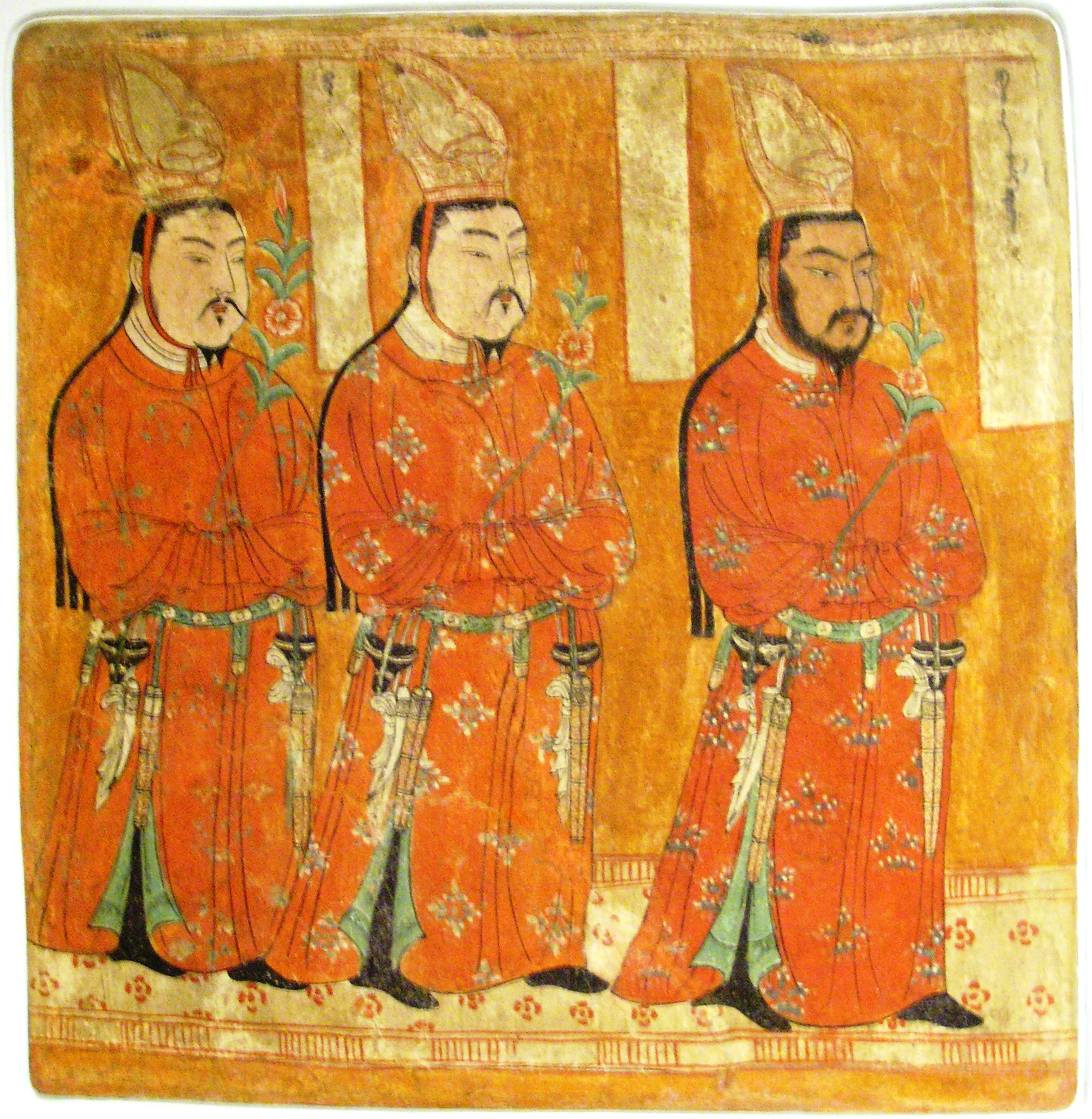
Uyghur royals in Chinese-style dresses

The Uyghur Khaganate had established itself by the year 744 AD. Through trade relations established with China, its capital city of Ordu Baliq in central Mongolia's Orkhon Valley became a wealthy center of commerce, and a significant portion of the Uyghur population abandoned their nomadic lifestyle for a sedentary one. The Uyghur Khaganate produced extensive literature, and a relatively high number of its inhabitants were literate.

The official state religion of the early Uyghur Khaganate was Manichaeism, which was introduced through the conversion of Bögü Qaghan by the Sogdians after the An Lushan rebellion. The Uyghur Khaganate was tolerant of religious diversity and practiced variety of religions including Buddhism, Christianity, shamanism and Manichaeism.

During the same time period, the Shatuo Turks emerged as power factor in Northern and Central China and were recognized by the Tang Empire as allied power.

In 808, 30,000 Shatuo under Zhuye Jinzhong defected from the Tibetans to Tang China and the Tibetans punished them by killing Zhuye Jinzhong as they were chasing them. The Uyghurs also fought against an alliance of Shatuo and Tibetans at Beshbalik.

The Shatuo Turks under Zhuye Chixin (Li Guochang) served the Tang dynasty in fighting against their fellow Turkic people in the Uyghur Khaganate. In 839, when the Uyghur khaganate (Huigu) general Jueluowu (掘羅勿) rose against the rule of then-reigning Zhangxin Khan, he elicited the help from Zhuye Chixin by giving Zhuye 300 horses, and together, they defeated Zhangxin Khan, who then committed suicide, precipitating the subsequent collapse of the Uyghur Khaganate. In the next few years, when Uyghur Khaganate remnants tried to raid Tang borders, the Shatuo participated extensively in counterattacking the Uyghur Khaganate with other tribes loyal to Tang. In 843, Zhuye Chixin, under the command of the Han Chinese officer Shi Xiong with Tuyuhun, Tangut and Han Chinese troops, participated in a raid against the Uyghur khaganate that led to the slaughter of Uyghur forces at Shahu mountain.

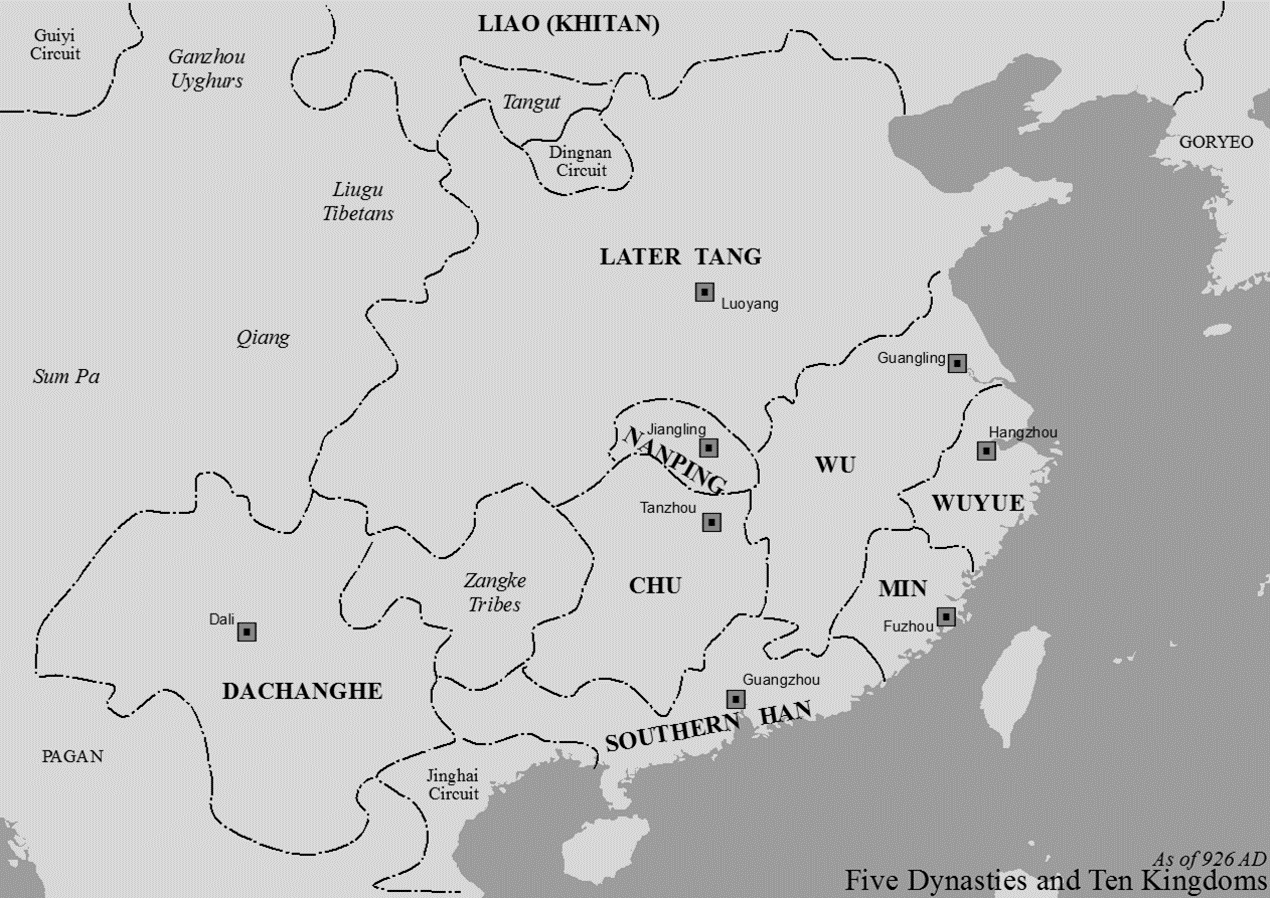
The Turkic Later Tang dynasty

The Shatuo Turks had founded several short-lived sinicized dynasties in northern China during the Five Dynasties and Ten Kingdoms period starting with Later Tang. The Shatuo chief Zhuye Chixin's family was adopted by the Tang dynasty and given the title prince of Jin and the Tang dynasty imperial surname of Li, which is why the Shatuo of Later Tang claimed to be restoring the Tang dynasty and not founding a new one. The official language of these dynasties was Chinese and they used Chinese titles and names. Some Shaotuo Turk emperors (of the Later Jin, Later Han and Northern Han) also claimed patrilineal Han Chinese ancestry.

After the fall of the Tang dynasty in 907, the Shatuo Turks replaced them and created the Later Tang dynasty in 923. The Shatuo Turks ruled over a large part of northern China, including Beijing. They adopted Chinese names and united Turkic and Chinese traditions. Later Tang fell in 937 but the Shatuo rose to become a powerful faction of northern China. They created two other dynasties, including the Later Jin and Later Han and Northern Han (Later Han and Northern Han were ruled by the same family, with the latter being a rump state of the former). The Shatuo Liu Zhiyuan was a Buddhist and he worshipped the Mengshan Giant Buddha in 945. The Shatuo dynasties were replaced by the Han Chinese Song dynasty. The Shatuo became the Ongud Turks living in Inner Mongolia after the Song dynasty conquered the last Shatuo dynasty of Northern Han. The Ongud assimilated to the Mongols.

The Yenisei Kyrgyz allied with China to destroy the Uyghur Khaganate in the year 840 AD. From the Yenisei River, the Kyrgyz pushed south and eastward in to Xinjiang and the Orkhon Valley in central Mongolia, leaving much of the Uyghur civilization in ruins. Much of the Uyghur population relocated to the southwest of Mongolia, establishing the Ganzhou Uyghur Kingdom in Gansu where their descendants are the modern-day Yugurs and Qocho Kingdom in Turpan, Xinjiang.

=== Central Asia ===
==== Kangar union (659–750) ====
Main article: Kangar union

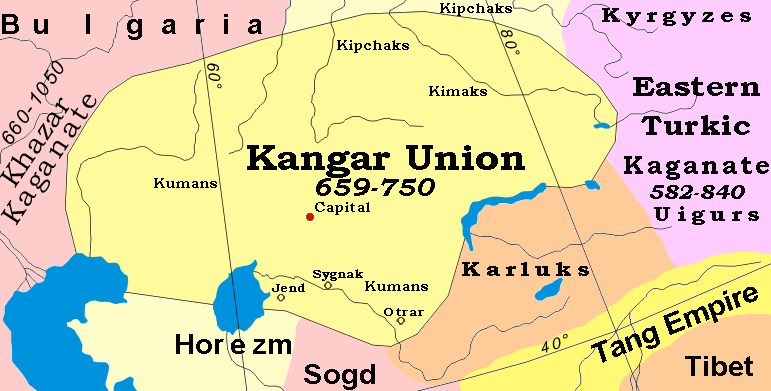
Kangar Union after the fall of Western Turkic Khaganate, 659–750

The Kangar Union (Qanghar Odaghu) was a Turkic state in the former territory of the Western Turkic Khaganate (the entire present-day state of Kazakhstan, without Zhetysu). The capital of the Kangar union was located in the Ulytau mountains. Among the Pechenegs, the Kangar (Note: For its etymology see Kangar union#Etymology) formed the elite of the Pecheneg tribes. After being defeated by the Kipchaks, Oghuz Turks, and the Khazars, they migrated west and defeated Magyars, and after forming an alliance with the Bulgars, they defeated the Byzantine Army. The Pecheneg state was established by the 11th century and at its peak carried a population of over 2.5 million, composed of many different ethnic groups.

The elite of the Kangar tribes are believed to have had an Iranian origin, and they likely spoke an Iranian language, while most of the Pecheneg population spoke a Turkic language, with a significant percentage speaking Hunno-Bulgar dialects.

The Yatuks, a tribe within the Kangar state who could not accompany the Kangars as they migrated West, remained in the old lands, where they are known as the Kangly people, who are now part of the Uzbek, Kazakh, and Karakalpak tribes.

==== Oghuz Yabgu State (766–1055) ====
Main article: Oghuz Yabgu State

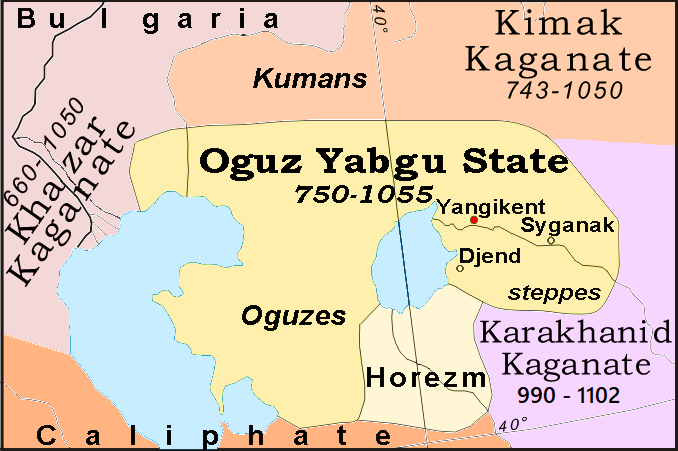
Oghuz Yabgu State (c.750 CE)

The Oguz Yabgu State (Oguz il, meaning "Oguz Land", "Oguz Country")(750–1055) was a Turkic state, founded by Oghuz Turks in 766, located geographically in an area between the coasts of the Caspian and Aral Seas. Oguz tribes occupied a vast territory in Kazakhstan along the Irgiz, Yaik, Emba, and Uil rivers, the Aral Sea area, the Syr Darya valley, the foothills of the Karatau Mountains in Tien-Shan, and the Chui River valley (see map). The Oguz political association developed in the 9th and 10th centuries in the Syr Darya basin.

==== Salar Oghuz migration ====
The Salars are descended from Turkmen who migrated from Central Asia and settled in a Tibetan area of Qinghai under Ming Chinese rule. The Salar ethnicity formed and underwent ethnogenesis from a process of male Turkmen migrants from Central Asia marrying Amdo Tibetan women during the early Ming dynasty.

=== Iranian, Indian, Arabic, and Anatolian expansion ===
Turkic peoples and related groups migrated west from present-day Northeastern China, Mongolia, Siberia and the Turkestan-region towards the Iranian plateau, South Asia, and Anatolia (modern Turkey) in many waves. The date of the initial expansion remains unknown.

==== Persia ====
===== Ghaznavid dynasty (977–1186) =====
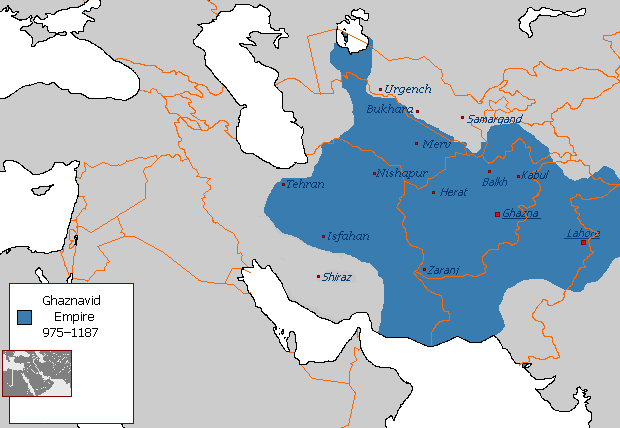
Ghaznavid Empire at its greatest extent in 1030 CE

The Ghaznavid Empire (Persian: غزنویان, romanized: Ġaznaviyān) was a culturally Persianate, (Note: The Ghaznavids also claimed ancestry from the last Sasanian Shah, Yazdgerd III, but this was "a fictitious genealogy" they themselves had promulgated.) Sunni Muslim state of Turkic Karluk origin. Flourishing from 977 to 1186, the empire spread from the Oxus to the Indus Valley at its greatest extent. The dynasty was founded by Sabuktigin upon his succession to the rule of Ghazna after the death of his father-in-law, Alp Tigin, who was an ex-general of the Samanid Empire from Balkh.

Sabuktigin's son, Mahmud of Ghazni, expanded the Ghaznavid Empire to the Amu Darya, the Indus River and the Indian Ocean in the east and to Rey and Hamadan in the west. Under the reign of Mas'ud I, the Ghaznavid dynasty began losing control over its western territories to the Seljuk Empire after the Battle of Dandanaqan in 1040, resulting in a restriction of its holdings to modern-day Afghanistan, Pakistan and Northern India.

In 1151, Sultan Bahram Shah lost Ghazni to the Ghurid sultan Ala al-Din Husayn. The Ghaznavids retook Ghazni but lost the city to the Ghuzz Turks who in turn lost it to Muhammad of Ghor. In response, the Ghaznavids fled to Lahore, their regional capital. In 1186, Lahore was conquered by the Ghurid sultan, Muhammad of Ghor, and its Ghaznavid ruler, Khusrau Malik, was imprisoned and later executed.

===== Seljuk Empire (1037–1194) =====
A map showing the Seljuk Empire at its height, upon the death of Malik Shah I in 1092.

The Seljuk Empire (/ˈsɛldʒuːk/ SEL-jook in BrE, /sɛlˈdʒuk/ sel-JOOK in AmE), or the Great Seljuk Empire, (Note: In order to distinguish it from the Anatolian branch of the Seljuk dynasty, the Sultanate of Rum.) was a high medieval, culturally Turco-Persian empire established and ruled by the Qïnïq branch of Oghuz Turks. The empire spanned a total area of 3.9 million square kilometres (1.5 million square miles) from Anatolia and the Levant in the west to the Hindu Kush in the east, and from Central Asia in the north to the Persian Gulf in the south, and covered the time period 1037–1308, though Seljuk rule beyond the Anatolian peninsula ended in 1194.

The Seljuk Empire was founded in 1037 by Tughril (990–1063) and his brother Chaghri (989–1060), both of whom co-ruled over its territories; there are indications that the Seljuk leadership otherwise functioned as a triumvirate and thus included Musa Yabghu, the uncle of the aforementioned two.

===== Timurid Empire (1370–1507) =====
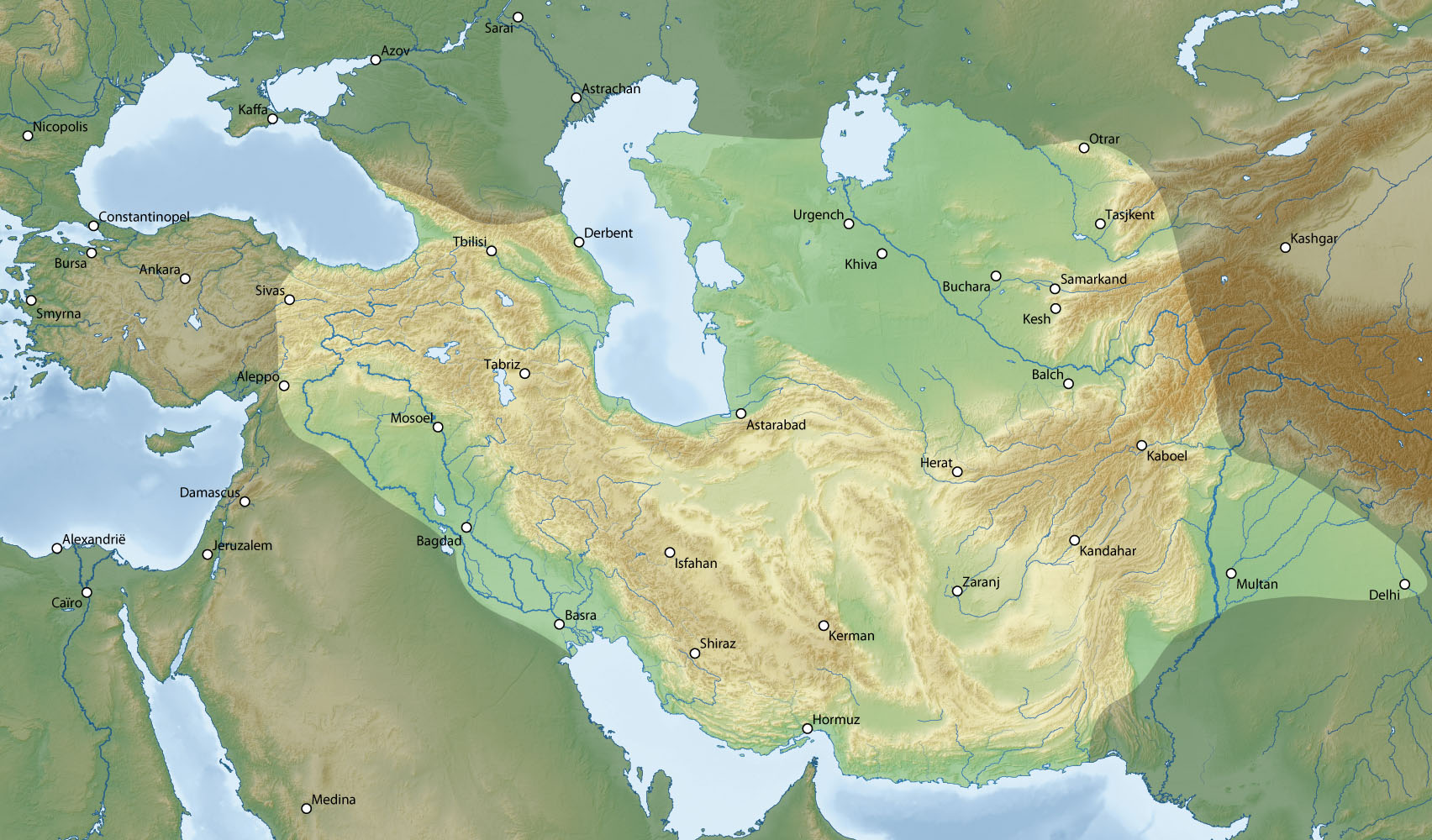
Map of the Timurid Empire at its greatest extent under Timur.

The Timurid Empire was a late medieval Turco-Mongol, culturally Persianate, Muslim empire that dominated Greater Iran in the early 15th century, comprising modern-day Iran, Iraq, Afghanistan, much of Central Asia, the South Caucasus, and parts of contemporary Pakistan, North India, and Turkey. The empire had a syncretic culture and combined Turkic, Mongolic, and Persian influences, with the last members of the dynasty being regarded as "ideal Perso-Islamic rulers".

The empire was founded by Timur (r. 1370–1405), also known as Tamerlane, a warlord belonging to the Barlas tribe, which was of Mongol origin but had become Turkified in language and culture. He saw himself as the great restorer of the Mongol Empire of Genghis Khan, regarded himself as his heir, and associated closely with the Borjigin. Timur continued to have strong trade relations with Ming China and the Golden Horde, with Chinese diplomats like Ma Huan and Chen Cheng traveling west to his capital, Samarkand. The empire led to the Timurid Renaissance, particularly during the reign of Shahrukh Mirza (1405–1447) and his astronomer and mathematician son Ulugh Beg (1447–1449).

===== Central Asian khanates (1501–1920) =====
Central Asia in 1636

The Khanate of Bukhara was an Uzbek monarchy in Central Asia from 1501 to 1785, founded by the Shaybanid dynasty, a branch of the Abu'l-Khayrids. Muhammad Shaybani, grandson of the steppe ruler Abu'l-Khayr Khan, conquered the major cities of Mawarannahr (Transoxiana) – Balkh, Bukhara, Samarkand, and Tashkent – and established his rule in the region. In its earliest years, the Khanate was alternately governed from each of these cities before Abdullah Khan II () established Bukhara as its permanent capital by 1562.

===== Afsharid dynasty (1736–1796) =====
The Afsharid dynasty (Persian: دودمان افشاریان, romanized: Dudemān-e Afshāriyān) was an Iranian dynasty founded by Nader Shah (r. 1736–1747) of the Qirqlu clan of the Turkoman Afshar tribe, ruling over Afsharid Iran.

===== Qajar dynasty (1789–1925) =====
The Qajar dynasty (Persian: دودمان قاجار, romanized: Dudemân-e Qâjâr) (Note: Also romanized as Ghajar, Kadjar, Qachar etc.) is a formerly Iranian aristocratic dynasty that gained prominence with the rise of Shahverdi Sultan in the early 16th century as heads of the Turkoman Qajar tribe of the Qizilbash confederacy. The dynasty ruled Iran from 1789 until 1925, beginning with the Unification of Iran (1779–1796) by Agha Mohammad Khan Qajar (r. 1789–1797).

==== South Asia ====
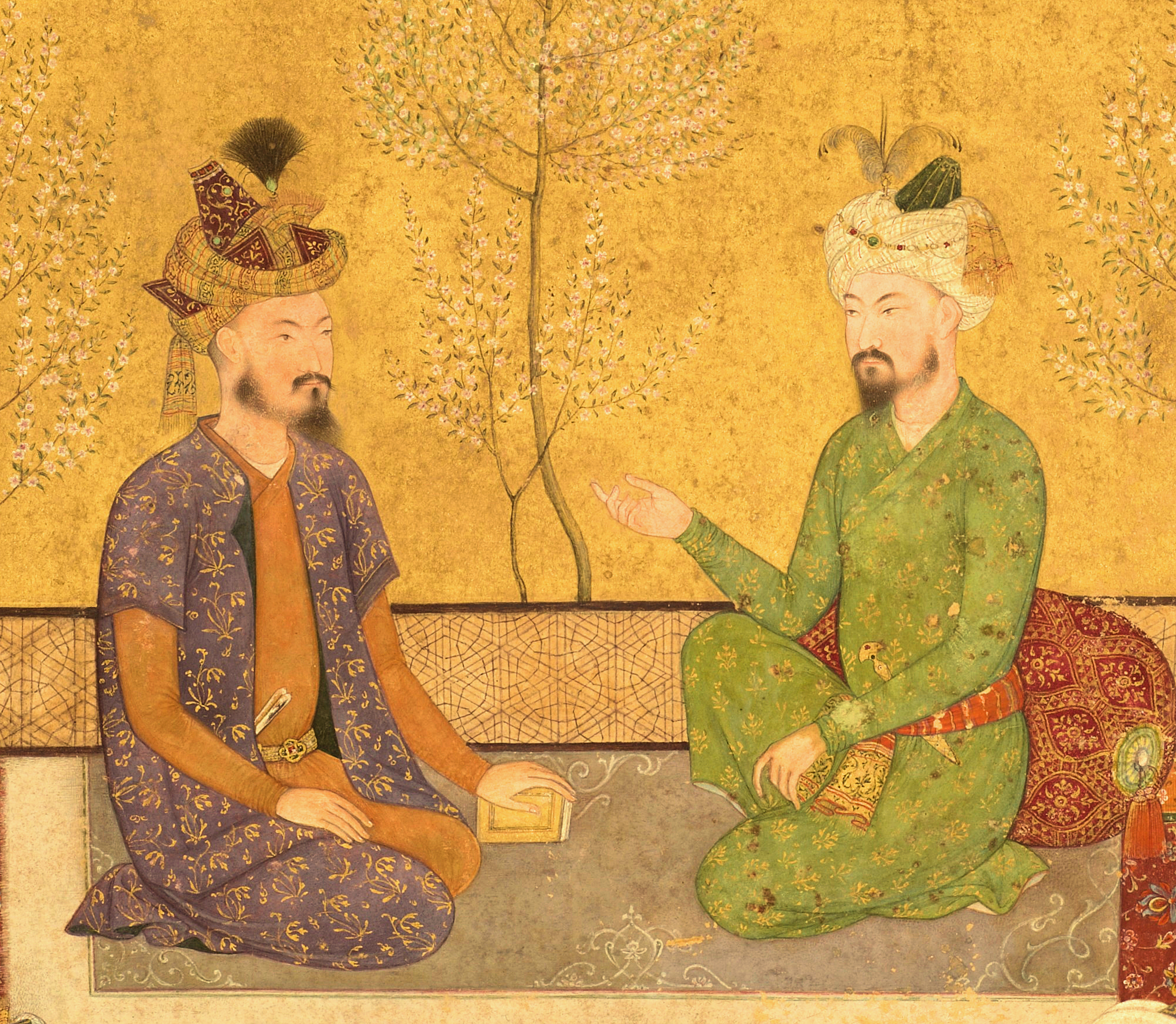
Babur, founder of the Mughal Empire and Mughal emperor Humayun.

Delhi Sultanate (1206–1526)

Qutb Minaret

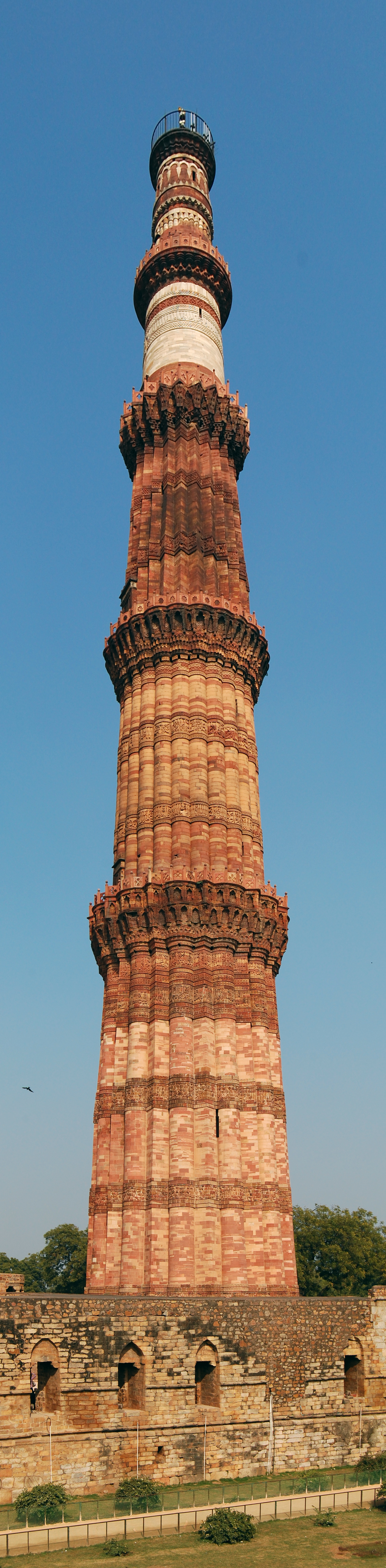
Minaret

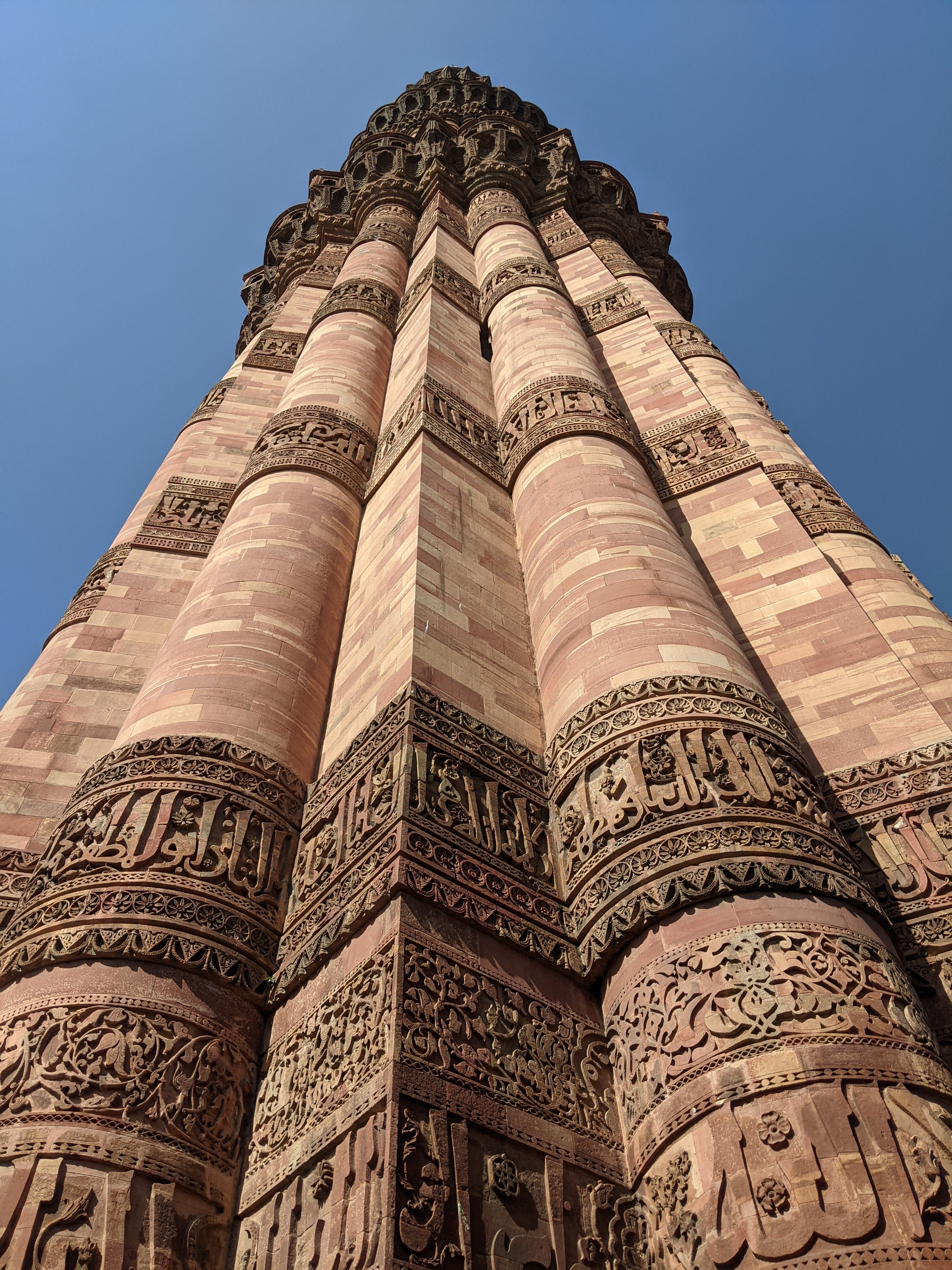
Base with inscriptions

The Qutb Minar, started by Qutb al-Din Aibak in 1199 and completed by his son-in-law Iltutmish in 1220, an example of the Mamluk dynasty's works. It is somewhat similar to the earlier Minaret of Jam in Afghanistan.

The Mamluk dynasty (lit. 'slave dynasty' - see mamluk), or the Mamluk Sultanate, is the historiographical name or umbrella term used to refer to the three dynasties of Mamluk origin who ruled the Ghurid territories in India and subsequently, the Sultanate of Delhi, from 1206 to 1290 — the Qutbi dynasty (1206–1211), the first Ilbari or Shamsi dynasty (1211–1266) and the second Ilbari dynasty (1266–1290).

Before the establishment of the Mamluk dynasty, Qutb al-Din Aibak's tenure as a Ghurid dynasty administrator lasted from 1192 to 1206, a period during which he led forays into the Gangetic plain and established control over some of the new areas. The last ruler, Shamsuddin Kayumars, an infant, was murdered by Jalal-ud-Din Khalji, a nobleman who then established the Khalji dynasty.

Mughal Empire (1526–1857)

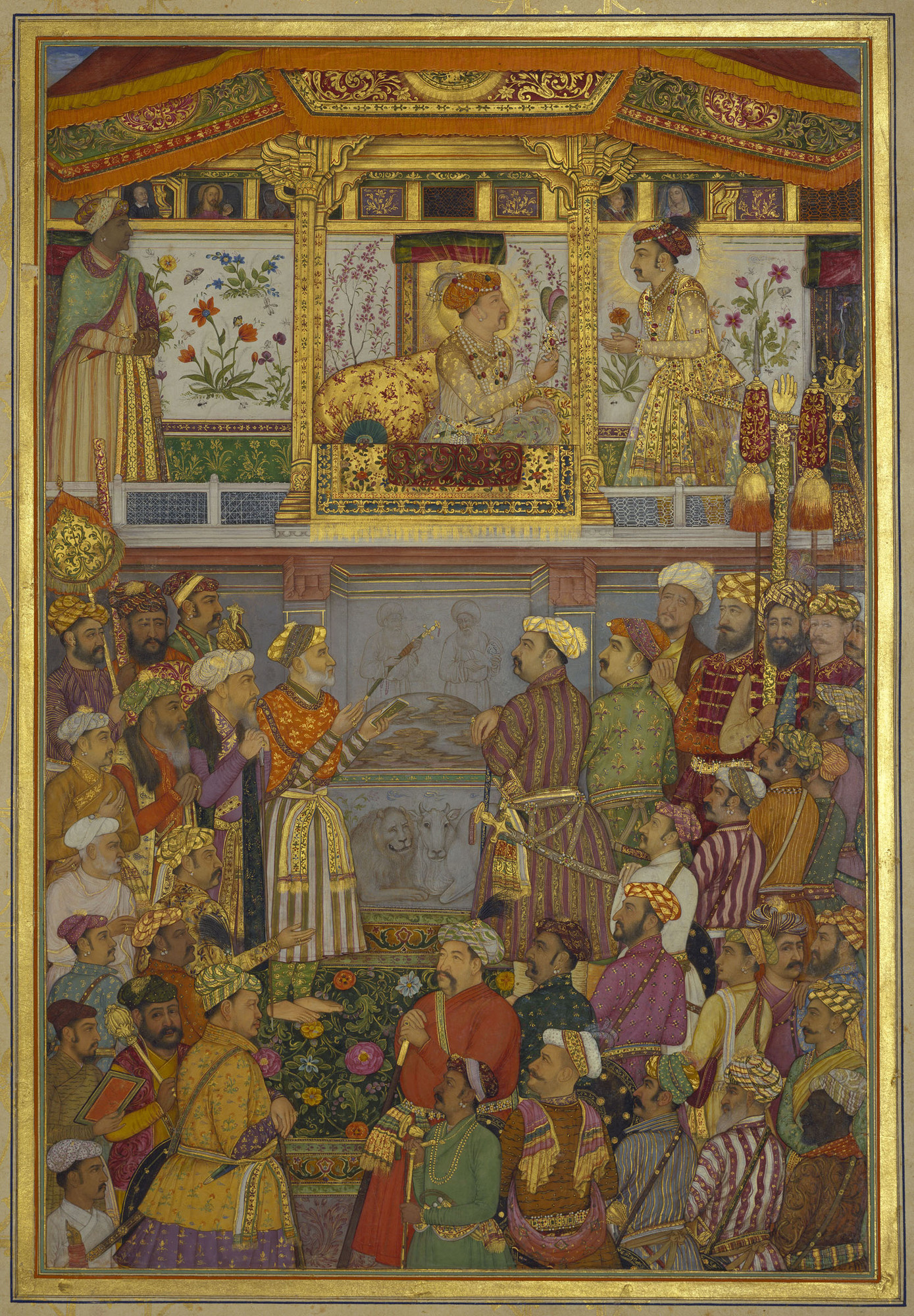
Mughal Emperor Jahangir presents Prince Khurram with a turban ornament.

The Mughal Empire was an early modern empire in South Asia. At its peak, the empire stretched from the outer fringes of the Indus River Basin in the west, northern Afghanistan in the northwest, and Kashmir in the north, to the highlands of present-day Assam and Bangladesh in the east, and the uplands of the Deccan Plateau in South India.

The Mughal Empire is conventionally said to have been founded in 1526 by Babur, a Timurid prince hailing from the Fergana Valley in Central Asia, who, with assistance from the Safavid and Ottoman empires, defeated the Sultan of Delhi, Ibrahim Lodi, in the First Battle of Panipat and swept down the plains of northern India. The Mughal imperial structure, however, is sometimes dated to 1600, during the rule of Babur's grandson, Akbar. This imperial structure lasted until 1720, shortly after the death of the last major emperor, Aurangzeb, during whose reign the empire also achieved its maximum geographical extent. Reduced subsequently to the region in and around Old Delhi by 1760, the empire was formally dissolved by the British Raj after the Indian Rebellion of 1857.

==== Arab world ====
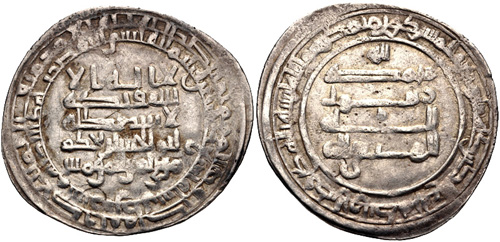
Silver dirham of AH 329 (940/941 CE), with the names of Caliph al-Muttaqi and Amir al-umara Bajkam (de facto ruler of the country)

The Arab Muslim Umayyads and Abbasids fought against the pagan Turks in the Türgesh Khaganate in the Muslim conquest of Transoxiana. Turkic soldiers in the army of the Abbasid caliphs emerged as the de facto rulers of most of the Muslim Middle East (apart from Syria and Egypt), particularly after the 10th century. Examples of regional de facto independent states include the short lived Tulunids and Ikhshidids in Egypt. The Oghuz and other tribes captured and dominated various countries under the leadership of the Seljuk dynasty and eventually captured the territories of the Abbasid dynasty and the Byzantine Empire.

==== Anatolia – Ottomans ====
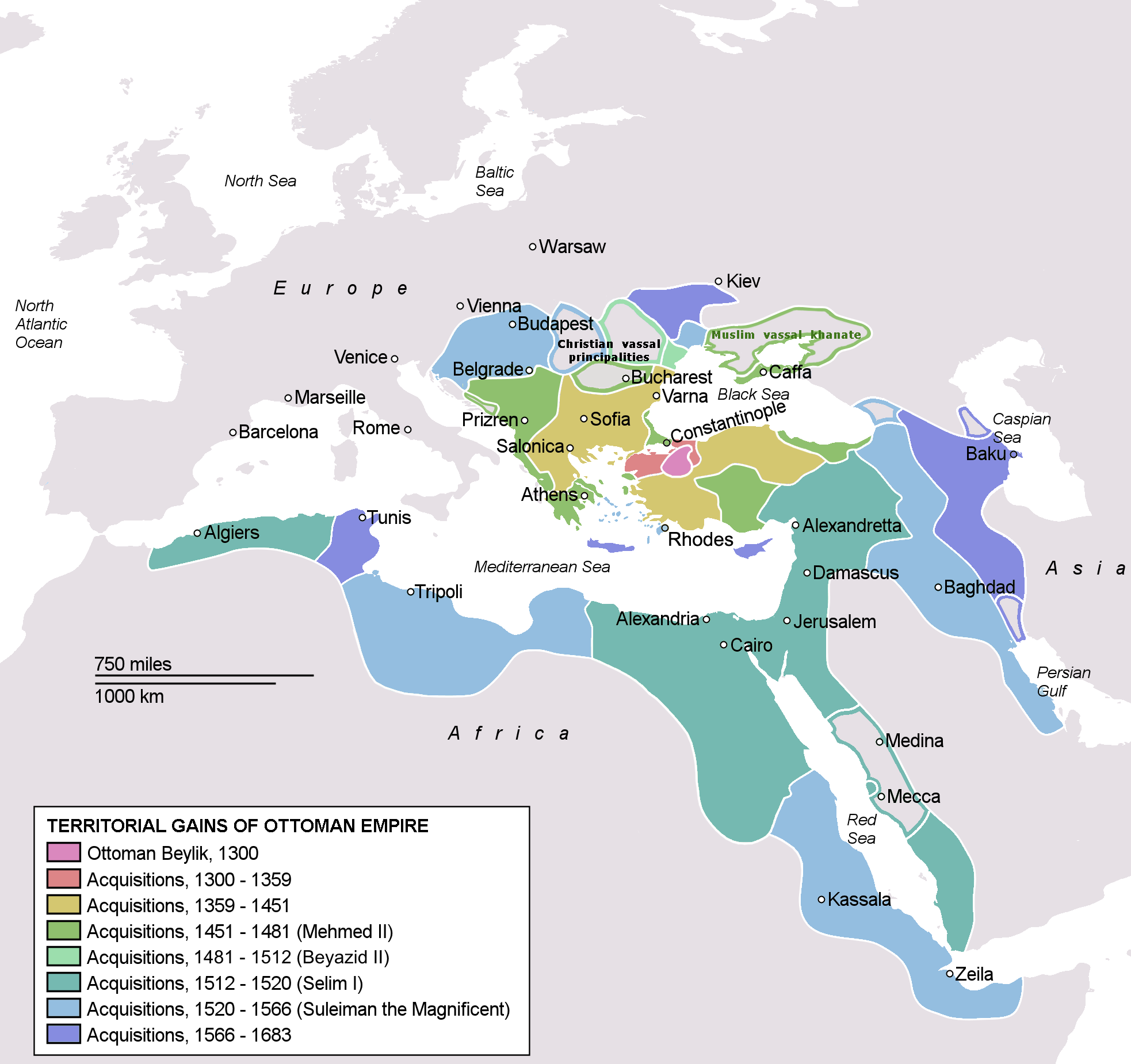
Ottoman empire in 1683

After many battles, the western Oghuz Turks established their own state and later constructed the Ottoman Empire. The main migration of the Oghuz Turks occurred in medieval times, when they spread across most of Asia and into Europe and the Middle East. They also took part in the military encounters of the Crusades. In 1090–91, the Turkic Pechenegs reached the walls of Constantinople, where Emperor Alexius I with the aid of the Kipchaks annihilated their army.

As the Seljuk Empire declined following the Mongol invasion, the Ottoman Empire emerged as the new important Turkic state, that came to dominate not only the Middle East, but even southeastern Europe, parts of southwestern Russia, and northern Africa.

==== Islamization ====
Turkic peoples like the Karluks (mainly 8th century), Uyghurs, Kyrgyz, Turkmens, and Kipchaks later came into contact with Muslims, and most of them gradually adopted Islam. Some groups of Turkic people practice other religions, including their original animistic-shamanistic religion, Christianity, Burkhanism, Judaism (Khazars, Krymchaks, Crimean Karaites), Buddhism, and a small number of Zoroastrians.

=== Modern history ===
Independent Turkic states shown in red

The Ottoman Empire gradually grew weaker in the face of poor administration, repeated wars with Russia, Austria and Hungary, and the emergence of nationalist movements in the Balkans, and it finally gave way after World War I to the present-day Republic of Turkey. Ethnic nationalism also developed in Ottoman Empire during the 19th century, taking the form of Pan-Turkism or Turanism.

The Turkic peoples of Central Asia were not organized in nation-states during most of the 20th century, after the collapse of the Russian Empire living either in the Soviet Union or (after a short-lived First East Turkestan Republic) in the Chinese Republic. For much of the 20th century, Turkey was the only independent Turkic country.

In 1991, after the disintegration of the Soviet Union, five Turkic states gained their independence. These were Azerbaijan, Kazakhstan, Kyrgyzstan, Turkmenistan, and Uzbekistan. Other Turkic regions such as Tatarstan, Tuva, and Yakutia remained in the Russian Federation. Chinese Turkestan remained part of the People's Republic of China. Immediately after the independence of the Turkic states, Turkey began seeking diplomatic relations with them. Over time political meetings between the Turkic countries increased and led to the establishment of TÜRKSOY in 1993 and the Turkic Council in 2009, which later was renamed Organization of Turkic States in 2021.

== Physiognomy ==
According to historians Joo-Yup Lee and Shuntu Kuang, Chinese official histories do not depict Turkic peoples as belonging to a single uniform entity called "Turks". However "Chinese histories also depict the Turkic-speaking peoples as typically possessing East/Inner Asian physiognomy, as well as occasionally having West Eurasian physiognomy." According to "fragmentary information on the Xiongnu language that can be found in the Chinese histories, the Xiongnu were Turkic", however historians have been unable to confirm whether or not they were Turkic. Sima Qian's description of their legendary origins suggest their physiognomy was "not too different from that of... Han (漢) Chinese population", but a subset of Xiongnu known as the Jie people were described having "deep-set eyes", "high nose bridges" and "heavy facial hair". The Jie may have been Yeniseian, although others maintaining an Iranian affiliation, and regardless of whether or not the Xiongnu were Turkic, they were a hybrid people. According to the Old Book of Tang, Ashina Simo "was not given a high military post by the Ashina rulers because of his Sogdian (huren 胡人) physiognomy." The Tang historian Yan Shigu described the Hu people of his day as "blue-eyed and red bearded" descendants of the Wusun, whereas "no comparable depiction of the Kök Türks or Tiele is found in the official Chinese histories."

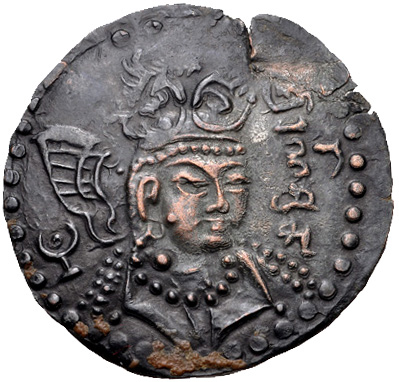
An early Turk Shahi ruler named Sri Ranasrikari "The Lord who brings excellence through war" (Brahmi script). In this realistic portrait, he wears the Turkic double-lapel caftan. Late 7th to early 8th century CE.

Historian Peter Golden has reported that genetic testing of the proposed descendants of the Ashina tribe does seem to confirm a link to the Indo-Iranians, emphasizing that "the Turks as a whole 'were made up of heterogeneous and somatically dissimilar populations'". Historian Emel Esin and Professor Xue Zongzheng have argued that West Eurasian features were typical of the royal Ashina clan of the Eastern Turkic Khaganate and that their appearance shifted to an East Asian one due to intermarriage with foreign nobility. As a result, by the time of Kul Tigin (684 AD), members of the Ashina dynasty had East Asian features. A 2023 genetic study found that Empress Ashina (568–578 AD), a Royal Göktürk, had nearly entirely Ancient Northeast Asian origin, weakening the "western Eurasian origin and multiple origin hypotheses". Lee and Kuang believe it is likely "early and medieval Turkic peoples themselves did not form a homogeneous entity and that some of them, non-Turkic by origin, had become Turkicised at some point in history." They also suggest that many modern Turkic-speaking populations are not directly descended from early Turkic peoples. Lee and Kuang concluded that "both medieval Chinese histories and modern DNA studies point to the fact that the early and medieval Turkic peoples were made up of heterogeneous and somatically dissimilar populations."

Like Chinese historians, Medieval Muslim writers generally depicted the Turks as having an East Asian appearance. Unlike Chinese historians, Medieval Muslim writers used the term "Turk" broadly to refer to not only Turkic-speaking peoples but also various non-Turkic speaking peoples, such as the Hephthalites, Rus, Magyars, and Tibetans. In the 13th century, Juzjani referred to the people of Tibet and the mountains between Tibet and Bengal as "Turks" and "people with Turkish features." Medieval Arab and Persian descriptions of Turks state that they looked strange from their perspective and were extremely physically different from Arabs. Turks were described as "broad faced people with small eyes", having light-colored, often reddish hair, and with pink skin, as being "short, with small eyes, nostrils, and mouths" (Sharaf al-Zaman al-Marwazi), as being "full-faced with small eyes" (Al-Tabari), as possessing "a large head (sar-i buzurg), a broad face (rūy-i pahn), narrow eyes (chashmhā-i tang), and a flat nose (bīnī-i pakhch), and unpleasing lips and teeth (lab va dandān na nīkū)" (Keikavus). On Western Turkic coins "the faces of the governor and governess are clearly Mongoloid (a roundish face, narrow eyes), and the portrait have definite old Türk features (long hair, absence of headdress of the governor, a tricorn headdress of the governess)".

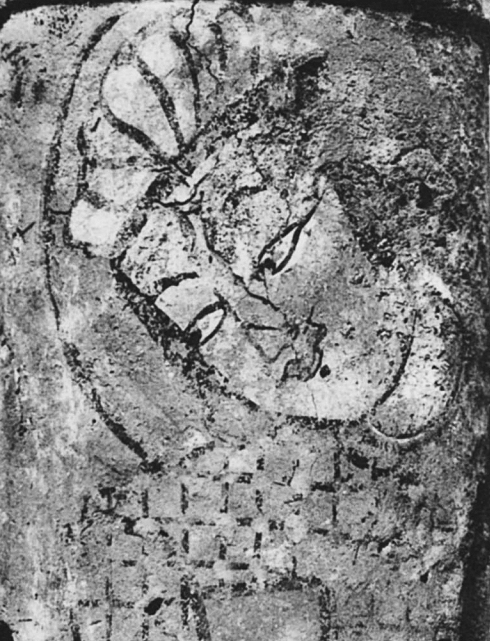
Ghaznavid portrait, Palace of Lashkari Bazar. Schlumberger noted that the turban, the small mouth and the strongly slanted eyes were characteristically Turkic.

In the Ghaznavids' residential palace of Lashkari Bazar, there survives a partially conserved portrait depicting a turbaned and haloed adolescent figure with full cheeks, slanted eyes, and a small, sinuous mouth. The Armenian historian Movses Kaghankatvatsi describes the Turks of the Western Turkic Khaganate as "broad-faced, without eyelashes, and with long flowing hair like women".

Al-Masudi writes that the Oghuz Turks in Yengi-kent near the mouth of the Syr Darya "are distinguished from other Turks by their valour, their slanted eyes, and the smallness of their stature." Later Muslim writers noted a change in the physiognomy of Oghuz Turks. According to Rashid al-Din Hamadani, "because of the climate their features gradually changed into those of Tajiks. Since they were not Tajiks, the Tajik peoples called them turkmān, i.e. Turk-like (Turk-mānand)." Ḥāfiẓ Tanīsh Mīr Muḥammad Bukhārī also related that the Oghuz' 'Turkic face did not remain as it was' after their migration into Transoxiana and Iran. Khiva khan Abu al-Ghazi Bahadur wrote in his Chagatai language treatise Shajara-i Tarākima (Genealogy of the Turkmens) that "their chin started to become narrow, their eyes started to become large, their faces started to become small, and their noses started to become big' after five or six generations". Ottoman historian Mustafa Âlî commented in Künhüʾl-aḫbār that Anatolian Turks and Ottoman elites are ethnically mixed: "Most of the inhabitants of Rûm are of confused ethnic origin. Among its notables there are few whose lineage does not go back to a convert to Islam."

Kevin Alan Brook states that like "most nomadic Turks, the Western Turkic Khazars were racially and ethnically mixed." Istakhri described Khazars as having black hair while Ibn Sa'id al-Maghribi described them as having blue eyes, light skin, and reddish hair. Istakhri mentions that there were "Black Khazars" and "White Khazars." Most scholars believe these were political designations: black being lower class while white being higher class. Constantin Zuckerman argues that these "had physical and racial differences and explained that they stemmed from the merger of the Khazars with the Barsils." Old East Slavic sources called the Khazars the "White Ugry" and the Magyars the "Black Ugry." Soviet excavated Khazar remains show Slavic-type, European-type, and a minority Mongoloid-type skulls.

The Yenisei Kyrgyz are mentioned in the New Book of Tang as having the same script and language as the Uyghurs but "The people are all tall and big and have red hair, white faces, and green eyes." (Note: 9th-century author Duan Chengshi described the Kyrgyz tribe (Jiankun buluo 堅昆部落) as "yellow-haired, green-eyed, red-mustached [and red-]bearded". New Book of Tang (finished in 1060) describes Alats, a medieval Turkic people, as resembling Kyrgyz who were "all tall, red-haired, pale-faced, green-irised"; New Book of Tang also states that Kyrgyz regarded black hair as "infelicitous" and insisted that black-eyed individuals were descendants of Han general Li Ling.) The New Book of Tang also states that the neighboring Boma tribe resembled the Kyrgyz but their language was different, which may imply the Kyrgyz were originally a non-Turkic people, who were later Turkicized through inter-tribal marriages. According to Gardizi, the Kyrgyz were mixed with "Saqlabs" (Slavs), which explains the red hair and white skin among the Kyrgyz, while the New Book states that the Kyrgyz "intermixed with the Dingling." The Kyrgyz "regarded those with black eyes as descending from [Li] Ling," a Han dynasty general who defected to the Xiongnu.

In a Chinese legal statute from the early period of the Ming dynasty, the Kipchaks are described as having blond hair and blue eyes. It also states that they had a "vile" and "peculiar" appearance, and that some Chinese people would not want to marry them. Russian anthropologist Oshanin (1964: 24, 32) notes that "the 'Mongoloid' phenotype, characteristic of modern Kazakhs and Qirghiz, prevails among the skulls of the Qipchaq and Pecheneg nomads found in the kurgans in eastern Ukraine"; Lee & Kuang (2017) propose that Oshanin's discovery is explainable by assuming that the historical Kipchaks' modern descendants are Kazakhs of the Lesser Horde, whose men possess a high frequency of haplogroup C2's subclade C2b1b1 (59.7 to 78%). Lee and Kuang also suggest that the high frequency (63.9%) of the Y-DNA haplogroup R-M73 among Karakypshaks (a tribe within the Kipchaks) allows inference about the genetics of Karakypshaks' medieval ancestors, thus explaining why some medieval Kipchaks were described as possessing "blue [or green] eyes and red hair.

Byzantine historians of the 11th-12th centuries provided description of Turkmens as very different from the Greeks. Bertrandon de la Broquière, a French traveller to the Ottoman Empire, met with sultan Murad II in Adrianople, and described him in the following terms: "In the first place, as I have seen him frequently, I shall say that he is a little, short, thick man, with the physiognomy of a Tartar. He has a broad and brown face, high cheek bones, a round beard, a great and crooked nose, with little eyes".

== International organizations ==
Map of TÜRKSOY members.

There are several international organizations created with the purpose of furthering cooperation between countries with Turkic-speaking populations, such as the Joint Administration of Turkic Arts and Culture (TÜRKSOY) and the Parliamentary Assembly of Turkic-speaking Countries (TÜRKPA) and the Turkic Council.

Members of the Organization of Turkic States (light blue states are observers)

The TAKM – Organization of the Eurasian Law Enforcement Agencies with Military Status, was established on 25 January 2013. It is an intergovernmental military law enforcement (gendarmerie) organization of currently three Turkic countries (Azerbaijan, Kyrgyzstan and Turkey) and Kazakhstan as observer.

=== TÜRKSOY ===
Türksoy carries out activities to strengthen cultural ties between Turkic peoples. One of the main goals to transmit their common cultural heritage to future generations and promote it around the world.

Every year, one city in the Turkic world is selected as the "Cultural Capital of the Turkic World". Within the framework of events to celebrate the Cultural Capital of the Turkic World, numerous cultural events are held, gathering artists, scholars and intellectuals, giving them the opportunity to exchange their experiences, as well as promoting the city in question internationally.

=== Organization of Turkic States ===
The Organization of Turkic States, founded on 3 November 2009, by the Nakhchivan Agreement confederation, Kazakhstan, Kyrgyzstan and Turkey, aims to integrate these organizations into a tighter geopolitical framework.

The member countries are Azerbaijan, Kazakhstan, Kyrgyzstan, Turkey and Uzbekistan. The idea of setting up this cooperative council was first put forward by Kazakh President Nursultan Nazarbayev back in 2006. Hungary has announced to be interested in joining the Organization of Turkic States. Since August 2018, Hungary has official observer status in the Organization of Turkic States. Turkmenistan also joined as an observer state to the organization at 8th summit. Turkish Republic of Northern Cyprus was admitted to the organization as observer member at the 2022 Samarkand Summit.

== Demographics ==
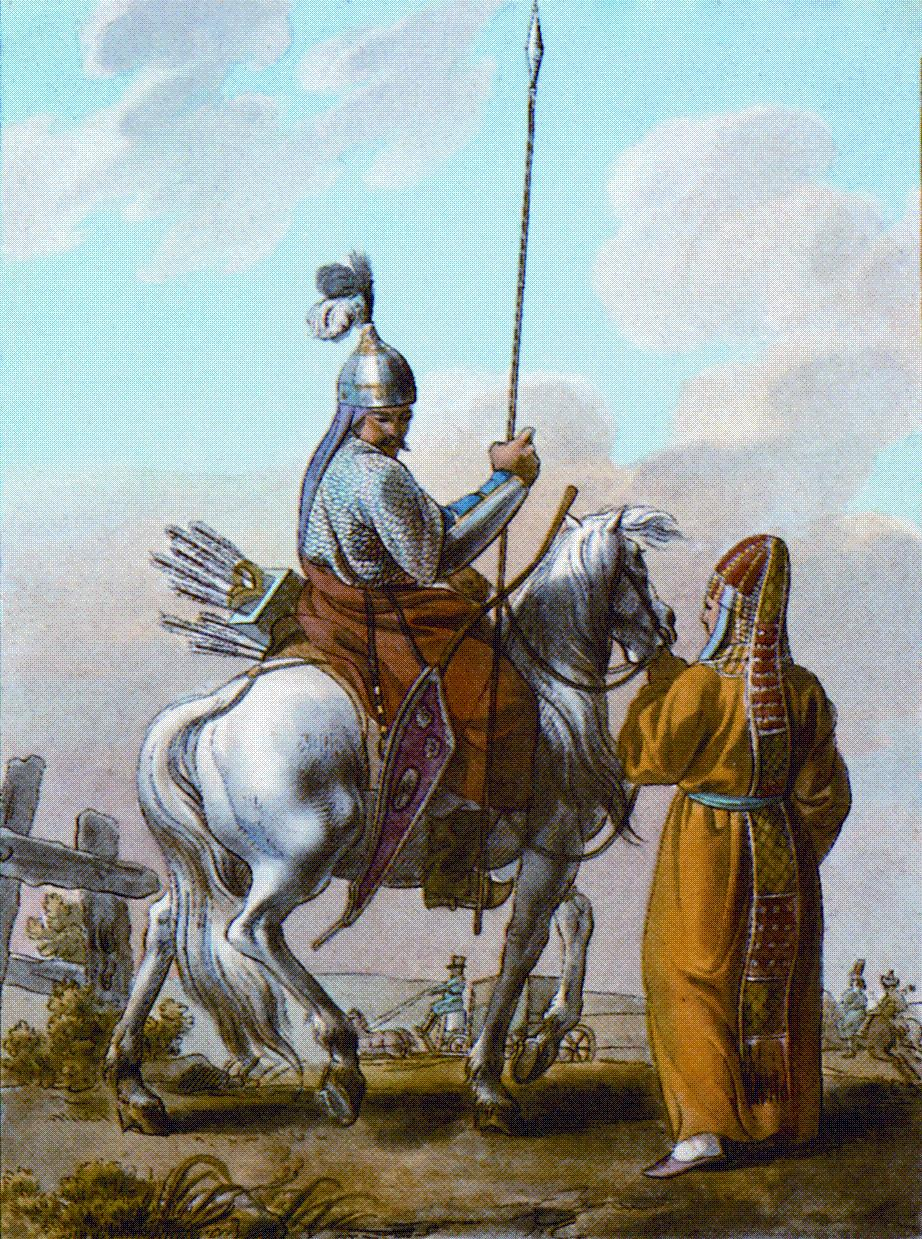
Bashkirs, painting from 1812, Paris

The distribution of people of Turkic cultural background ranges from Siberia, across Central Asia, to Southern Europe. As of 2011 the largest groups of Turkic people live throughout Central Asia—Kazakhstan, Kyrgyzstan, Turkmenistan, Uzbekistan, and Azerbaijan, in addition to Turkey and Iran. Additionally, Turkic people are found within Crimea, Altishahr region of western China, northern Iraq, Israel, Russia, Afghanistan, Cyprus, and the Balkans: Moldova, Bulgaria, Romania, Greece and former Yugoslavia.

A small number of Turkic people also live in Vilnius, the capital of Lithuania. Small numbers inhabit eastern Poland and the south-eastern part of Finland. There are also considerable populations of Turkic people (originating mostly from Turkey) in Germany, United States, and Australia, largely because of migrations during the 20th century.

Sometimes ethnographers group Turkic people into six branches: the Oghuz Turks, Kipchak, Karluk, Siberian, Chuvash, and Sakha/Yakut branches. The Oghuz have been termed Western Turks, while the remaining five, in such a classificatory scheme, are called Eastern Turks.

The genetic distances between the different populations of Uzbeks scattered across Uzbekistan is no greater than the distance between many of them and the Karakalpaks. This suggests that Karakalpaks and Uzbeks have very similar origins. The Karakalpaks have a somewhat greater bias towards the eastern markers than the Uzbeks.

Historical population:

Year	Population
1 AD	2–2.5 million?
2013	150–200 million

The following incomplete list of Turkic people shows the respective groups' core areas of settlement and their estimated sizes (in millions):

People	Primary homeland	Population	Modern language	Predominant religion and sect
Turkish people	Turkey	70 M	Turkish	Sunni Islam
Azerbaijanis	Iranian Azerbaijan, Republic of Azerbaijan	30–35 M	Azerbaijani	Shia Islam (65%), Sunni Islam (35%) (Hanafi).
Uzbeks	Uzbekistan	28.3 M	Uzbek	Sunni Islam
Kazakhs	Kazakhstan	13.8 M	Kazakh	Sunni Islam
Uyghurs	Altishahr (China)	9 M	Uyghur	Sunni Islam
Turkmens	Turkmenistan	8 M	Turkmen	Sunni Islam
Tatars	Tatarstan (Russia)	7 M	Tatar	Sunni Islam
Kyrgyzs	Kyrgyzstan	4.5 M	Kyrgyz	Sunni Islam
Bashkirs	Bashkortostan (Russia)	2 M	Bashkir	Sunni Islam
Crimean Tatars	Crimea (Russia/Ukraine)	0.5 to 2 M	Crimean Tatar	Sunni Islam
Chuvashes	Chuvashia (Russia)	1.7 M	Chuvash	Orthodox Christianity
Qashqai	Southern Iran (Iran)	0.9 M	Qashqai	Shia Islam
Karakalpaks	Karakalpakstan (Uzbekistan)	0.6 M	Karakalpak	Sunni Islam
Yakuts	Yakutia (Russia)	0.5 M	Sakha	Orthodox Christianity and Turkic Paganism
Kumyks	Dagestan (Russia)	0.4 M	Kumyk	Sunni Islam
Karachays and Balkars	Karachay-Cherkessia and Kabardino-Balkaria (Russia)	0.4 M	Karachay-Balkar	Sunni Islam
Tuvans	Tuva (Russia)	0.3 M	Tuvan	Tibetan Buddhism
Gagauzs	Gagauzia (Moldova)	0.2 M	Gagauz	Orthodox Christianity
Turkic Karaites and Krymchaks	Ukraine	0.004 M	Karaim and Krymchak	Judaism

== Cuisine ==
Markets in the steppe region had a limited range of foodstuffs available—mostly grains, dried fruits, spices, and tea. Turks mostly herded sheep, goats and horses. Dairy was a staple of the nomadic diet and there are many Turkic words for various dairy products such as süt (milk), yagh (butter), ayran, qaymaq (similar to clotted cream), qi̅mi̅z (fermented mare's milk) and qurut (dried yoghurt). During the Middle Ages Kazakh, Kyrgyz and Tatars, who were historically part of the Turkic nomadic group known as the Golden Horde, continued to develop new variations of dairy products.

Nomadic Turks cooked their meals in a qazan, a pot similar to a cauldron; a wooden rack called a qasqan can be used to prepare certain steamed foods, like the traditional meat dumplings called manti. They also used a saj, a griddle that was traditionally placed on stones over a fire, and shish. In later times, the Persian tava was borrowed from the Persians for frying, but traditionally nomadic Turks did most of their cooking using the qazan, saj and shish. Meals were served in a bowl, called a chanaq, and eaten with a knife (bïchaq) and spoon (qashi̅q). Both bowl and spoon were historically made from wood. Other traditional utensils used in food preparation included a thin rolling pin called oqlaghu, a colander called süzgu̅çh, and a grinding stone called tāgirmān.

Medieval grain dishes included preparations of whole grains, soups, porridges, breads and pastries. Fried or toasted whole grains were called qawïrmach, while köchä was crushed grain that was cooked with dairy products. Salma were broad noodles that could be served with boiled or roasted meat; cut noodles were called tutmaj in the Middle Ages and are called kesme today.

There are many types of bread doughs in Turkic cuisine. Yupqa is the thinnest type of dough, bawi̅rsaq is a type of fried bread dough, and chälpäk is a deep-fried flat bread. Qatlama is a fried bread that may be sprinkled with dried fruit or meat, rolled, and sliced like pinwheel sandwiches. Toqach and chöräk are varieties of bread, and böräk is a type of filled pie pastry.

Herd animals were usually slaughtered during the winter months and various types of sausages were prepared to preserve the meats, including a type of sausage called sujuk. Though prohibited by Islamic dietary restrictions, historically Turkic nomads also had a variety of blood sausage. One type of sausage, called qazi̅, was made from horsemeat and another variety was filled with a mixture of ground meat, offal and rice. Chopped meat was called qïyma and spit-roasted meat was söklünch—from the root sök- meaning "to tear off", the latter dish is known as kebab in modern times. Qawirma is a typical fried meat dish, and kullama is a soup of noodles and lamb.

== Religion ==
=== Early Turkic mythology and Tengrism ===
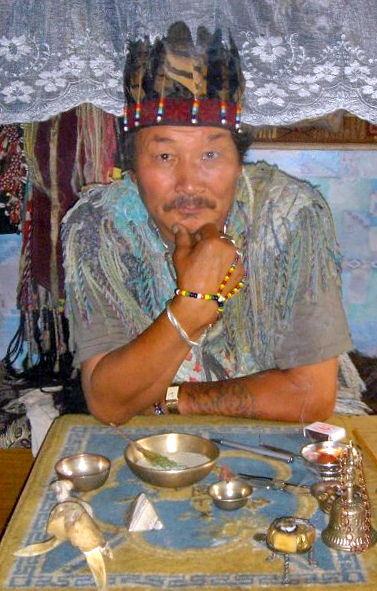
A shaman doctor of Kyzyl.

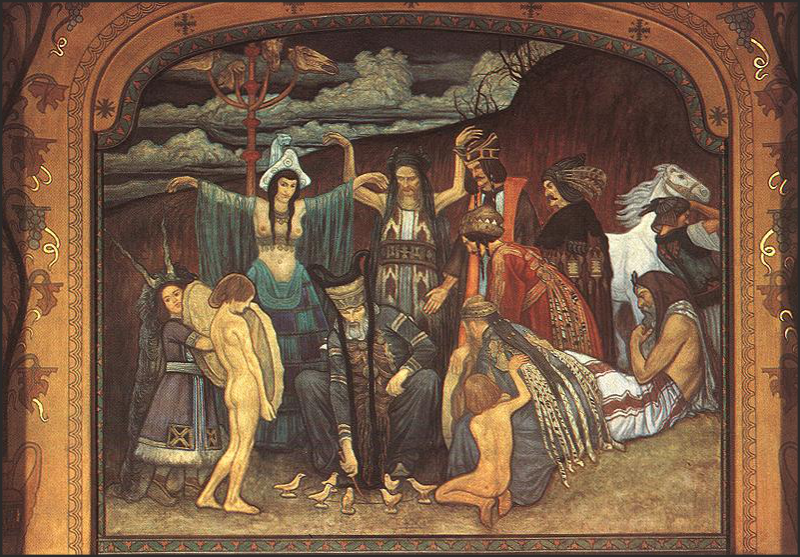
Circle dance of Shamans 1911

Early Turkic mythology was dominated by Shamanism, Animism and Tengrism. The Turkic animistic traditions were mostly focused on ancestor worship, polytheistic-animism and shamanism. Later this animistic tradition would form the more organized Tengrism. The chief deity was Tengri, a sky god, worshipped by the upper classes of early Turkic society until Manichaeism was introduced as the official religion of the Uyghur Empire in 763.

The wolf symbolizes honour and is also considered the mother of most Turkic peoples. Ashina is the wolf mother of Tumen Il-Qağan, the first Khan of the Göktürks. The horse and predatory birds, such as the eagle or falcon, are also main figures of Turkic mythology.

=== Religious conversions ===
==== Buddhism ====
Buddhism played an important role in the history of Turkic peoples, with the first Turkic state adopting and supporting the spread of Buddhism being the Turkic Shahis and the Göktürks. The Göktürks syncretized Buddhism with their traditional religion Tengrism and also incorporated elements of the Iranian traditional religions, such as Zoroastrianism. Buddhism had its height among the Uyghurs in the Xinjiang region. Buddhism had also considerable impact and influence onto various other historical Turkic groups. In pre-Islamic times, Buddhism and Tengrism coexisted, with several Buddhist temples, monasteries, figures and steles, with images of Buddhist characters and sceneries, were constructed by various Turkic tribes. Throughout Kazakhstan, there exist various historical Buddhist sites, including an underground Buddhist cave monastery. After the Arab conquest of Central Asia, and the spread of Islam among locals, Buddhism (and Tengrism) started to lose ground, however a certain influence of the Buddhist teachings remained during the next centuries.

Tengri Bögü Khan initially made the now extinct Manichaeism the state religion of the Uyghur Khaganate in 763 and it was also popular among the Karluks. It was gradually replaced by the Mahayana Buddhism. It existed in the Buddhist Uyghur Gaochang up to the 12th century.

Tibetan Buddhism, or Vajrayana was the main religion after Manichaeism. They worshipped Täŋri Täŋrisi Burxan, Quanšï Im Pusar and Maitri Burxan. Turkic Muslim conquest in the Indian subcontinent and west Xinjiang attributed with a rapid and almost total disappearance of it and other religions in North India and Central Asia. The Sari Uygurs "Yellow Yughurs" of Western China, as well as the Tuvans of Russia are the only remaining Buddhist Turkic peoples.

==== Islam ====
Astana Grand Mosque, the largest mosque in Central Asia.

Most Turkic people today are Sunni Muslims, although a significant number in Turkey are Alevis. Alevi Turks, who were once primarily dwelling in eastern Anatolia, are today concentrated in major urban centers in western Turkey with the increased urbanism. Turkic Sunni Muslims generally follow the Hanafi rite. Azeris are traditionally Shiite Muslims. Religious observance is less strict in the Republic of Azerbaijan compared to Iranian Azerbaijan.

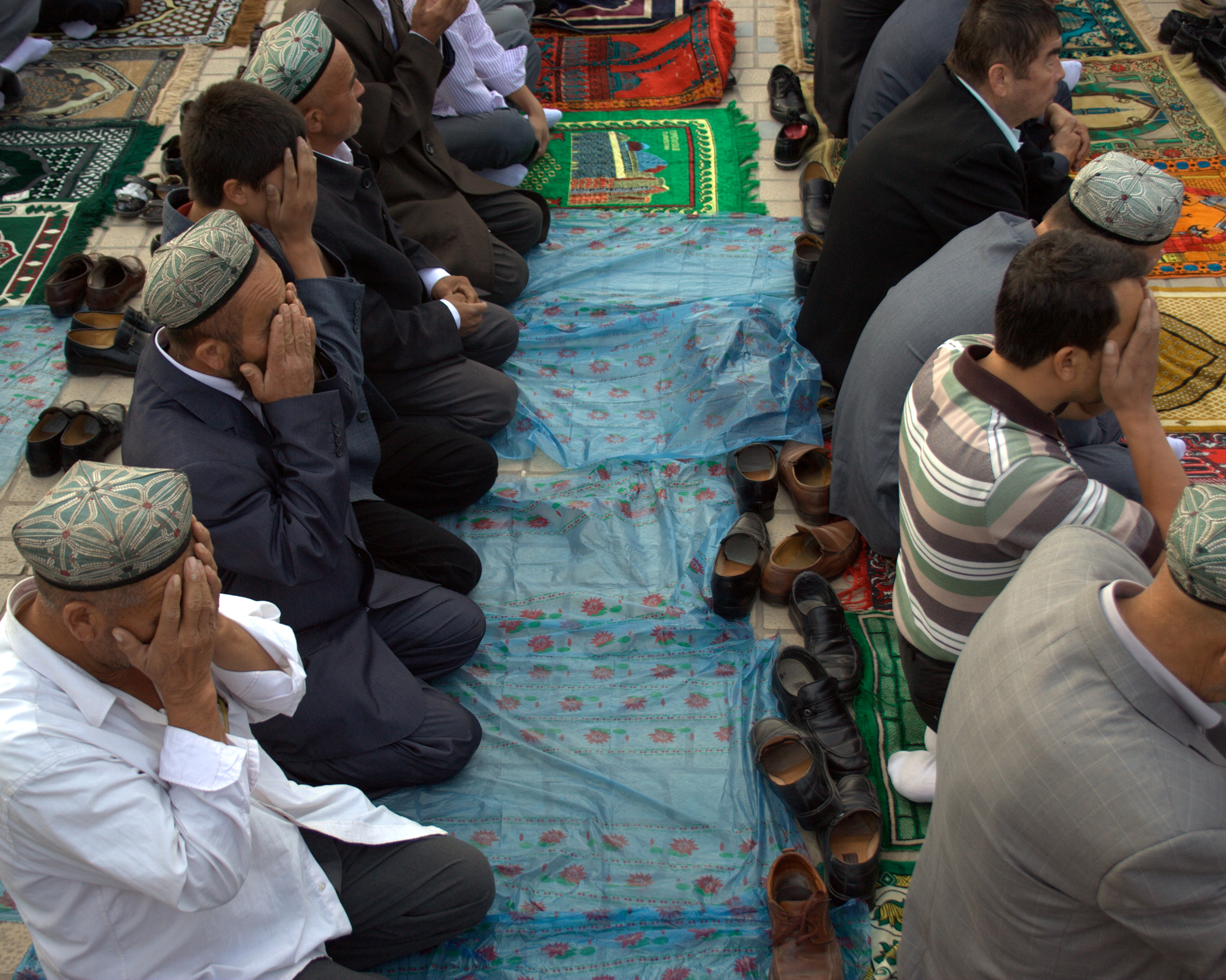
Muslim Uyghurs at prayer.

Islam first made contact with the Turkic peoples in 642, when Muslim armies crossed the Amu Darya after toppling the Sassanid Empire the year before. Some of the earliest rulers to convert to Islam were the Turkic princes of the city-states in the region of Sogdiana. Mass conversions did not take place until the Battle of Talas in 751, in which Turkic tribes sided with the Arabs against Chinese forces, which marked a significant milestone in the history of Islam in the region. From then onwards much of the Turkic heartland became Muslim. In the 19th century, Turkic Muslim progressives in the Russian Empire spearheaded a reformist movement called Jadidism, calling for a return to basic Islamic beliefs while simultaneously accepting modernist trends.

==== Christianity ====
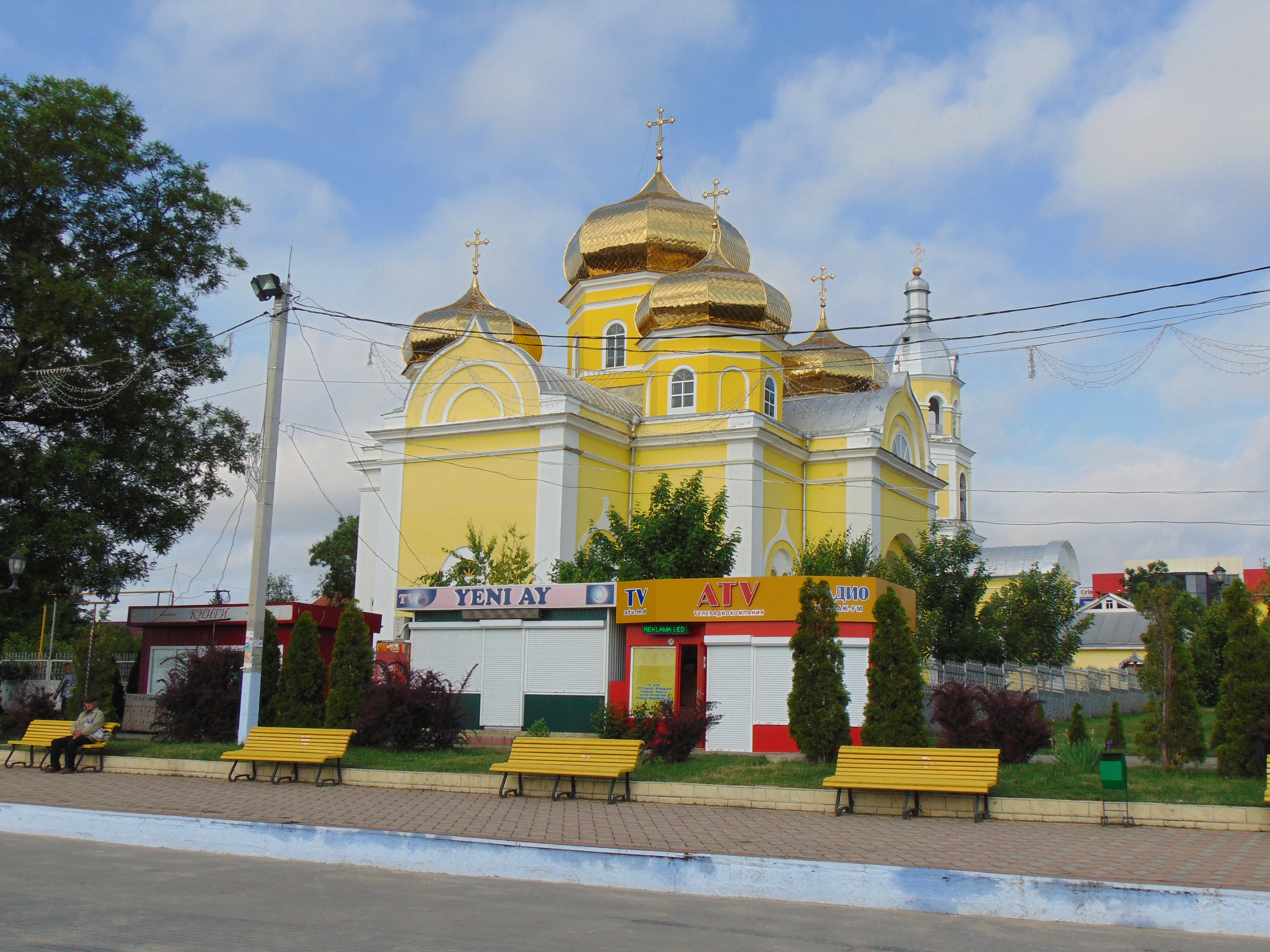
Saint John the Baptist Cathedral in Gagauzia

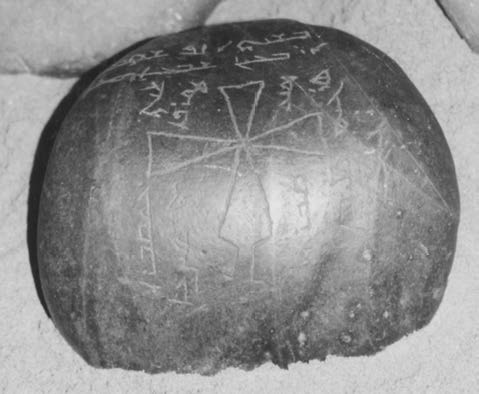
Gravestone from Kyrgyzstan (thirteenth/fourteenth century) with Syriac Christian inscriptions

The major Christian-Turkic peoples are the Chuvash of Chuvashia and the Gagauz (Gökoğuz) of Moldova, the vast majority of Chuvash and the Gagauz are Eastern Orthodox Christians. The traditional religion of the Chuvash of Russia, while containing many ancient Turkic concepts, also shares some elements with Zoroastrianism, Khazar Judaism, and Islam. The Chuvash converted to Eastern Orthodox Christianity for the most part in the second half of the 19th century. As a result, festivals and rites were made to coincide with Orthodox feasts, and Christian rites replaced their traditional counterparts. A minority of the Chuvash still profess their traditional faith. Between the 9th and 14th centuries, Church of the East was popular among Turks such as the Naimans. It even revived in Gaochang and expanded in Xinjiang in the Yuan dynasty period. It disappeared after its collapse.

Kryashens are a sub-group of the Volga Tatars, and the vast majority are Orthodox Christians. Nağaybäk are an indigenous Turkic people in Russia, most Nağaybäk are Christian and were largely converted during the 18th century. Many Volga Tatars were Christianized by Ivan the Terrible during the 16th century, and continued to Christianized under subsequent Russian rulers and Orthodox clergy up to the mid-eighteenth century.

==== Animism ====
Today there are several groups that support a revival of the ancient traditions. Especially after the collapse of the Soviet Union, many in Central Asia converted or openly practice animistic and shamanistic rituals. It is estimated that about 60% of Kyrgyz people practice a form of animistic rituals. In Kazakhstan there are about 54,000 followers of the ancient traditions.

==== Muslim Turks and non-Muslim Turks ====
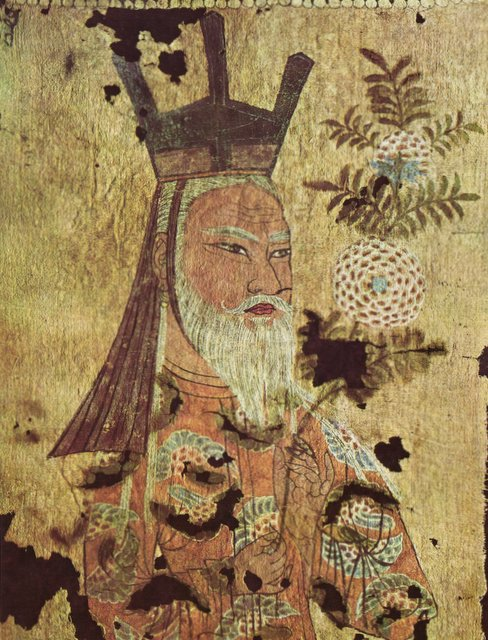
An Old Uyghur Khagan

The Uyghur Turks, who once belonged to a variety of religions, were gradually Islamized during a period spanning the 10th and 13th centuries. Some scholars have linked the phenomenon of recently Islamized Uyghur soldiers recruited by the Mongol Empire to the slow conversion of Uyghur populations to Islam.

The non-Muslim Turks' worship of Tengri and other gods was mocked and insulted by the Muslim Turk Mahmud al-Kashgari, who wrote a verse referring to them – The Infidels – May God destroy them!

The Basmil, Yabāḳu and Uyghur states were among the Turkic peoples who fought against the Kara-Khanids spread of Islam. The Islamic Kara-Khanids were made out of Tukhsi, Yaghma, Çiğil and Karluk.

Kashgari claimed that the Prophet assisted in a miraculous event where 700,000 Yabāqu infidels were defeated by 40,000 Muslims led by Arslān Tegīn claiming that fires shot sparks from gates located on a green mountain towards the Yabāqu. The Yabaqu were a Turkic people.

Mahmud al-Kashgari insulted the Uyghur Buddhists as "Uighur dogs" and called them "Tats", which referred to the "Uighur infidels" according to the Tuxsi and Taghma, while other Turks called Persians "tat". While Kashgari displayed a different attitude towards the Turks diviners beliefs and "national customs", he expressed towards Buddhism a hatred in his Diwan where he wrote the verse cycle on the war against Uighur Buddhists. Buddhist origin words like toyin (a cleric or priest) and Burxān or Furxan (meaning Buddha, acquiring the generic meaning of "idol" in the Turkic language of Kashgari) had negative connotations to Muslim Turks.

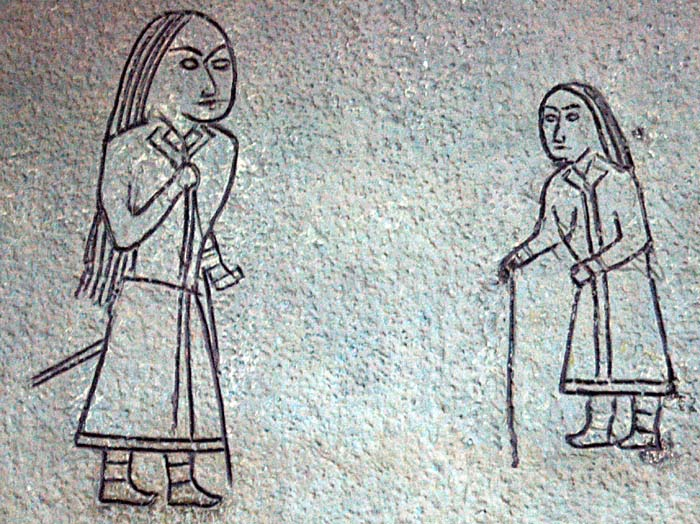
Göktürk petroglyphs from Mongolia (6th to 8th century)

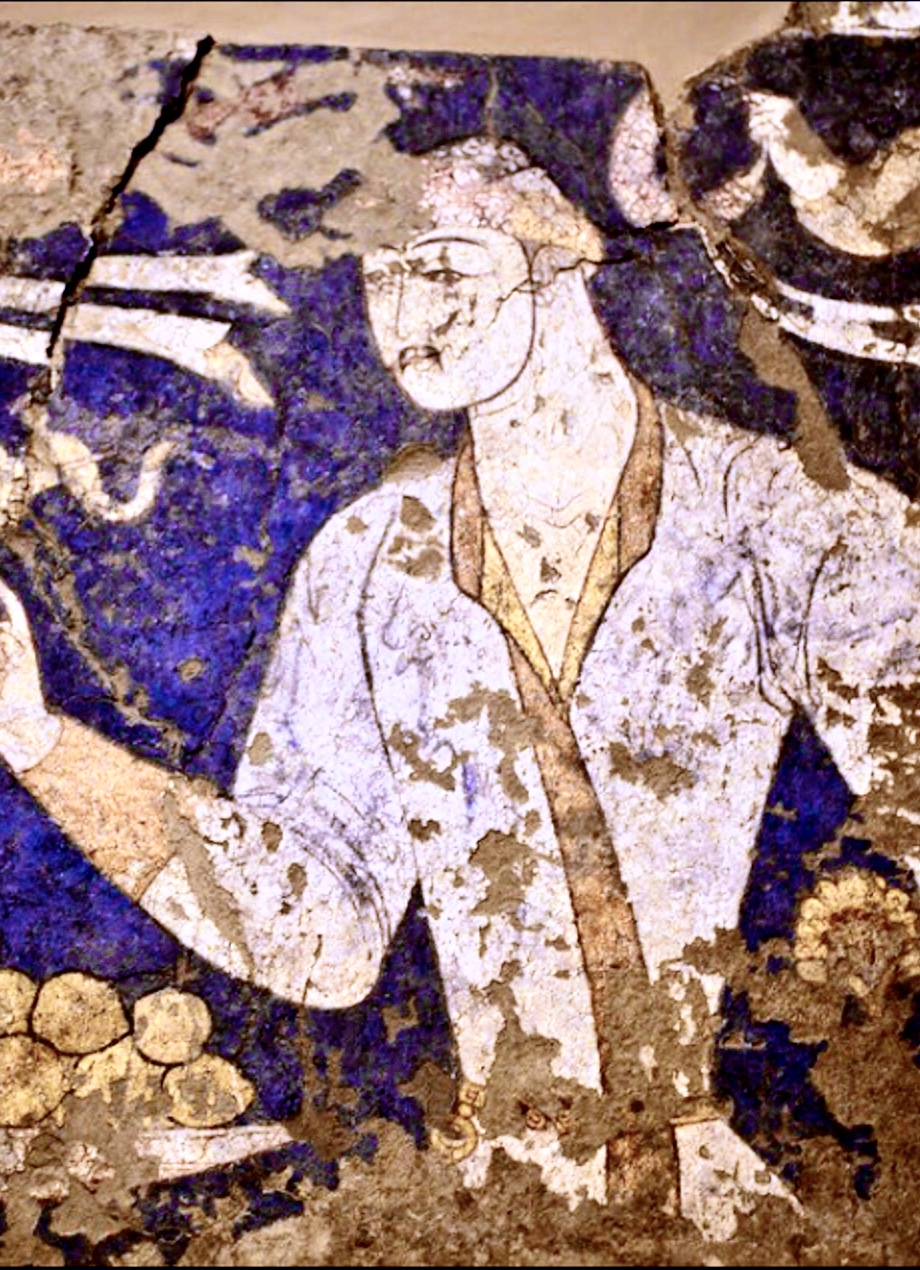
A Penjikent man dressed in "Turkic" long coats, 6th–8th c.

== Old sports ==
=== Tepuk ===
Mahmud al-Kashgari in his Dīwān Lughāt al-Turk, described a game called "tepuk" among Turks in Central Asia. In the game, people try to attack each other's castle by kicking a ball made of sheep leather. (see also: Cuju)

=== Kyz kuu ===
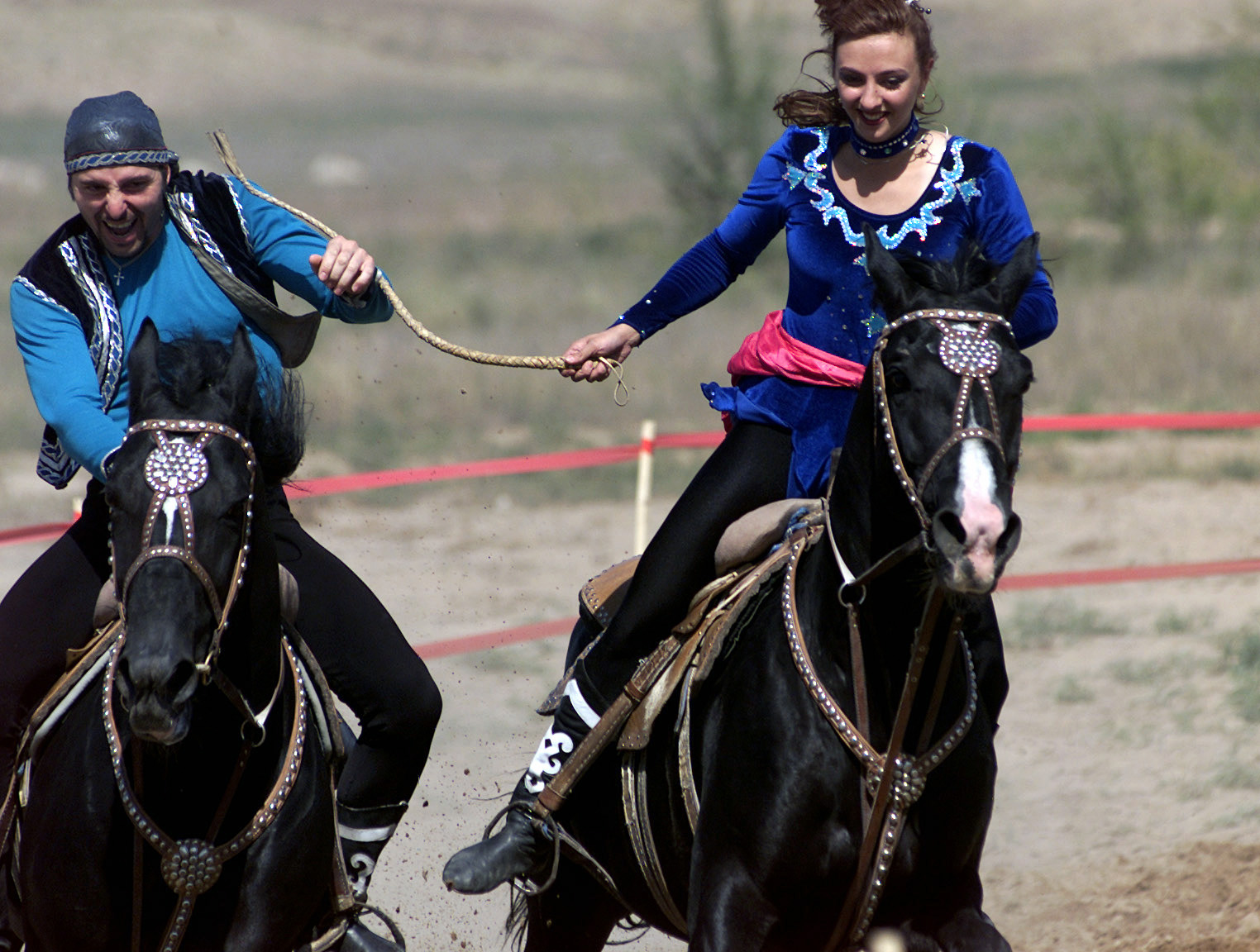
Kyz kuu.

Kyz kuu (chase the girl) has been played by Turkic people at festivals since time immemorial.

=== Jereed ===
Horses have been essential and even sacred animals for Turks living as nomadic tribes in the Central Asian steppes. Turks were born, grew up, lived, fought and died on horseback. Jereed became the most important sporting and ceremonial game of Turkish people.

=== Kokpar ===
The kokpar began with the nomadic Turkic peoples who have come from farther north and east spreading westward from China and Mongolia between the 10th and 15th centuries.

=== Mounted wrestling ===
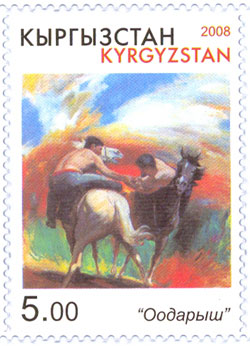
Mounted wrestling

Traditional mounted wrestling ru:Аударыспак/kk:Аударыспақ/tt:Аударыш.

=== Jigit ===
"jigit" is used in the Caucasus and Central Asia to describe a skillful and brave equestrian, or a brave person in general.

== Gallery ==
=== Battle, hunting and blacksmithing scenes in Turkic rock art of the early Middle Ages in Altai ===
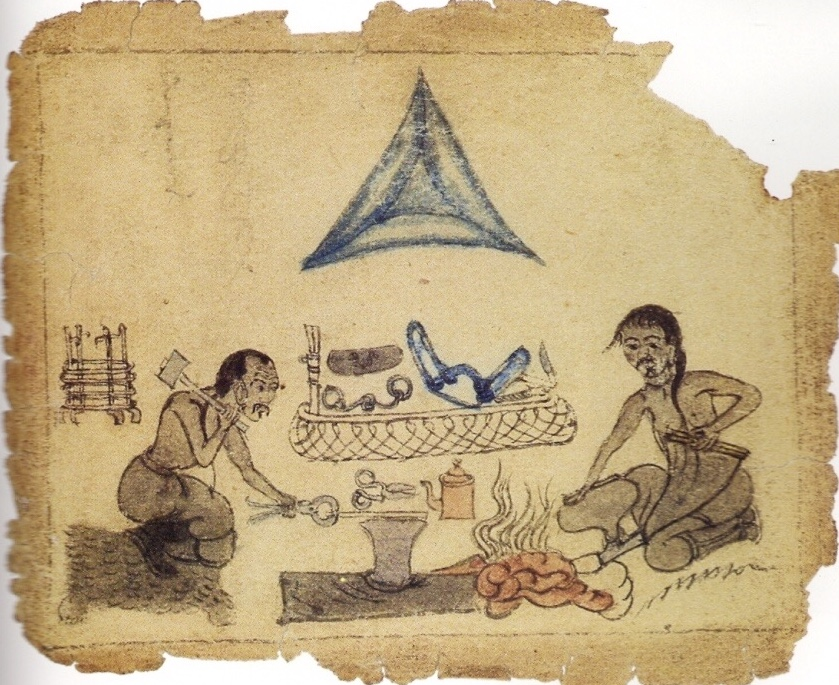
Turk vassal blacksmiths under Mongolian rule

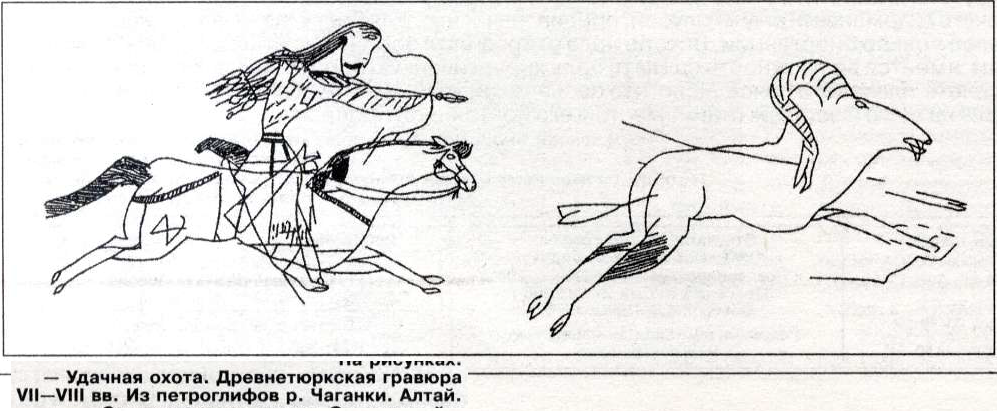
Turkic hunting scene, Gokturk period Altai

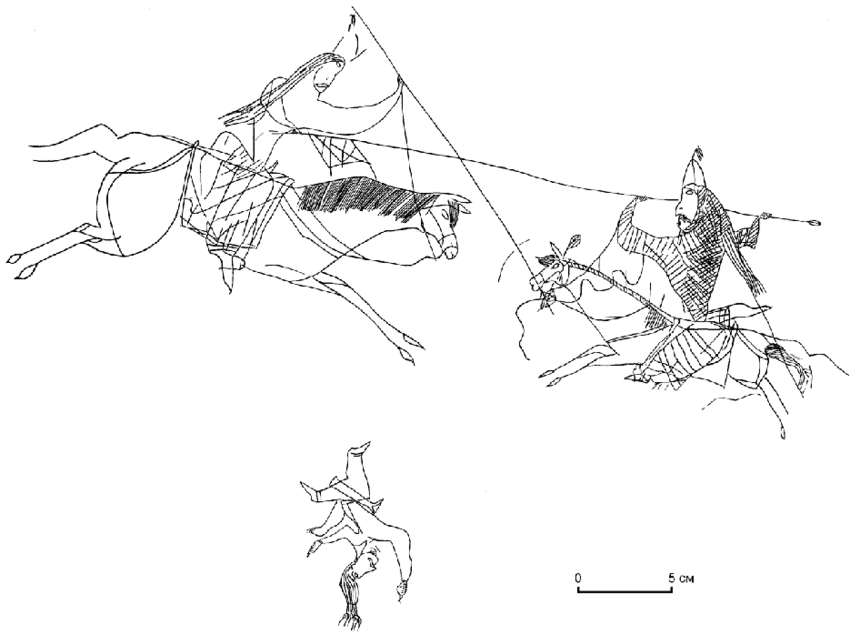
Battle scene of a Turkic horseman with typical long hair (Gokturk period, Altai)

=== Bezeklik caves and Mogao grottoes ===
Images of Buddhist and Manichean Old Uyghurs from the Bezeklik caves and Mogao grottoes.

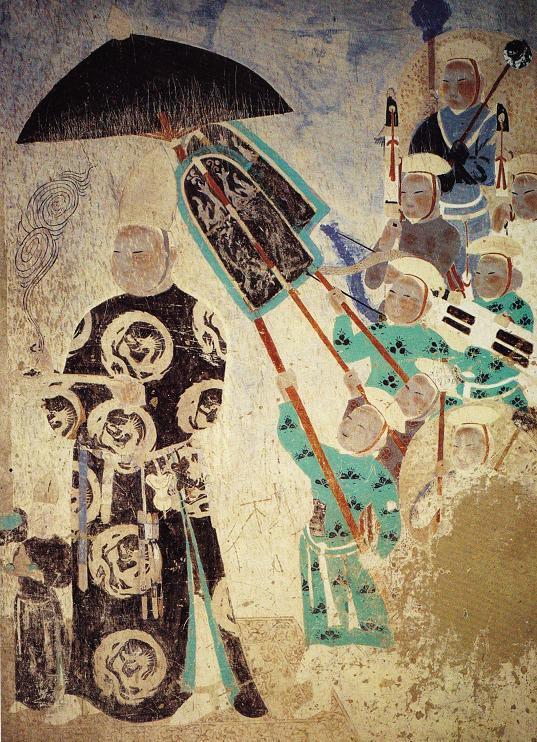
Old Uyghur king from Turfan, from the murals at the Dunhuang Mogao Caves.

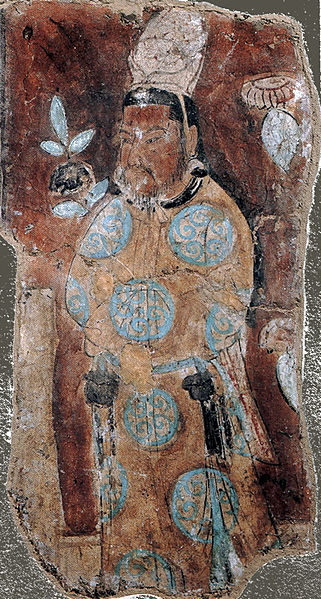
Old Uyghur prince from the Bezeklik murals.

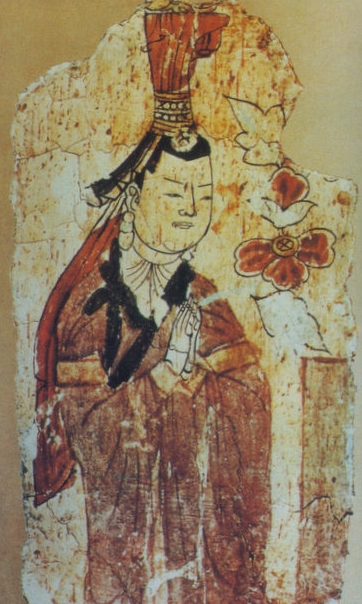
Old Uyghur woman from the Bezeklik murals.

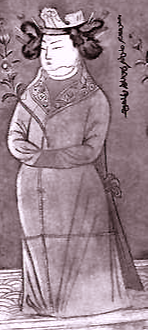
Old Uyghur Princess.

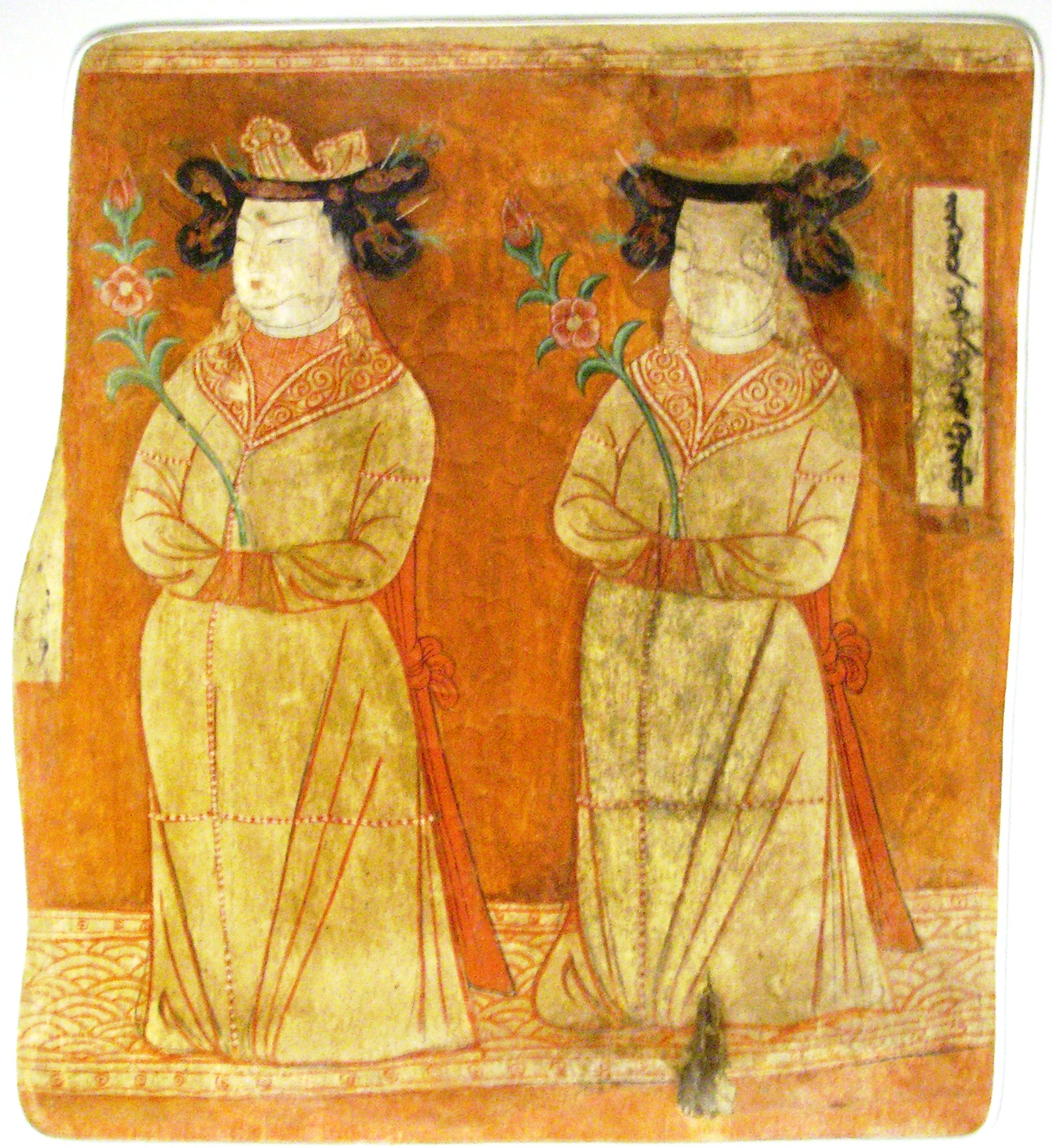
Old Uyghur Princesses from the Bezeklik murals.

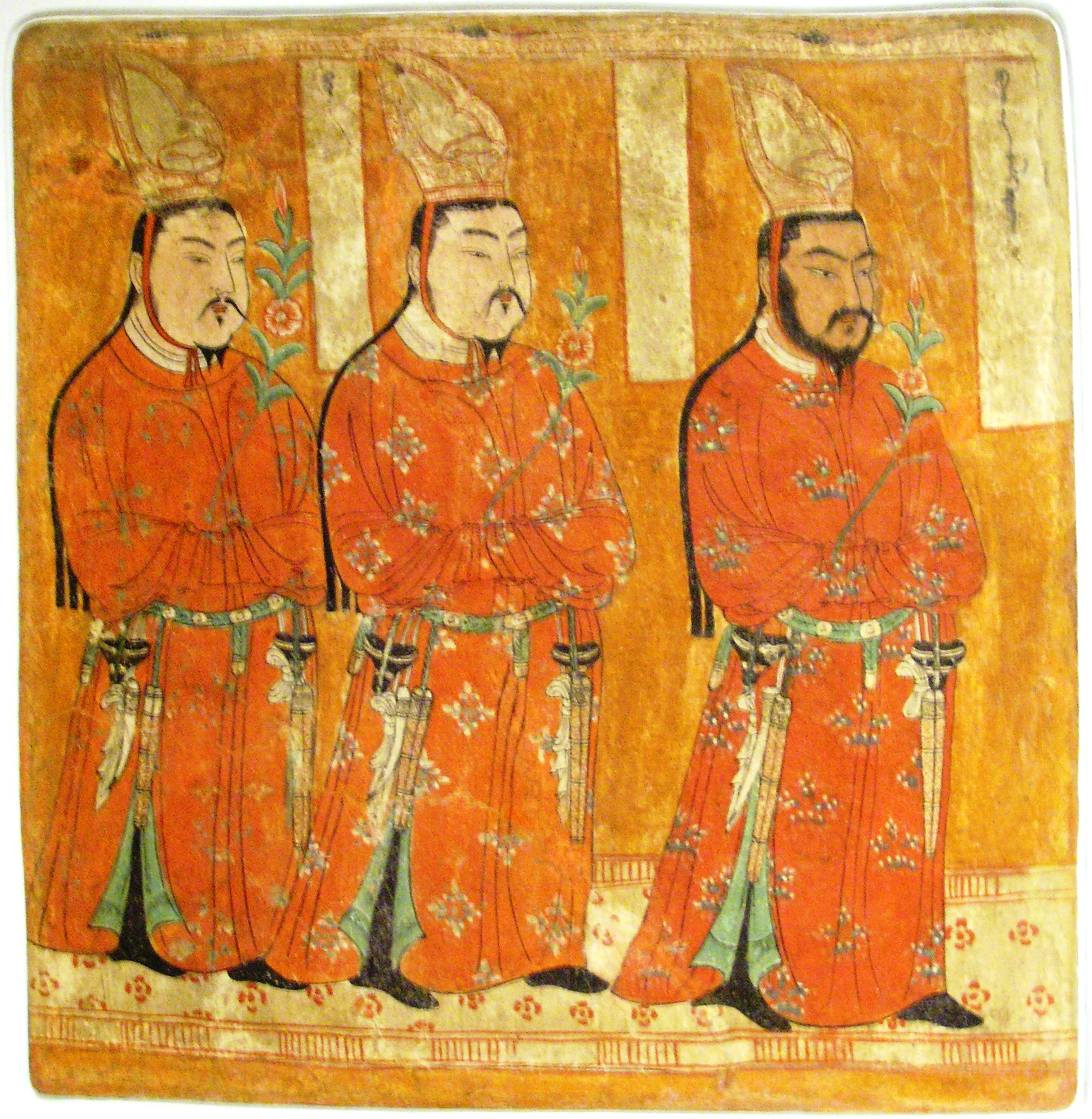
Old Uyghur Princes from the Bezeklik murals.

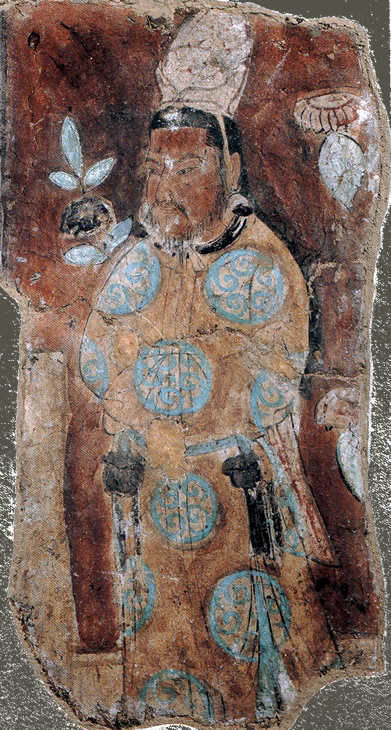
Old Uyghur Prince from the Bezeklik murals.

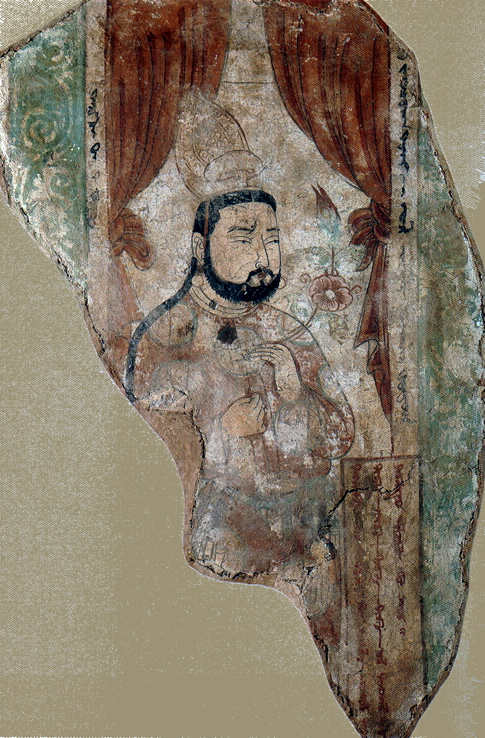
Old Uyghur noble from the Bezeklik murals.

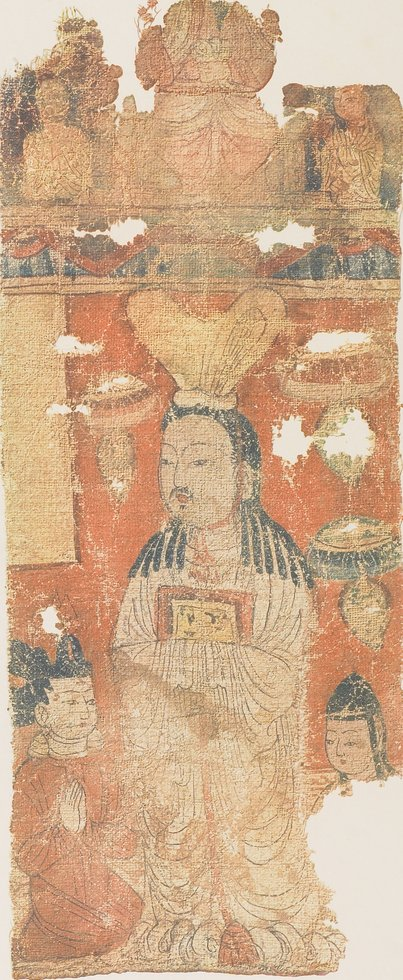
Old Uyghur Manichaean Elect depicted on a temple banner from Qocho.

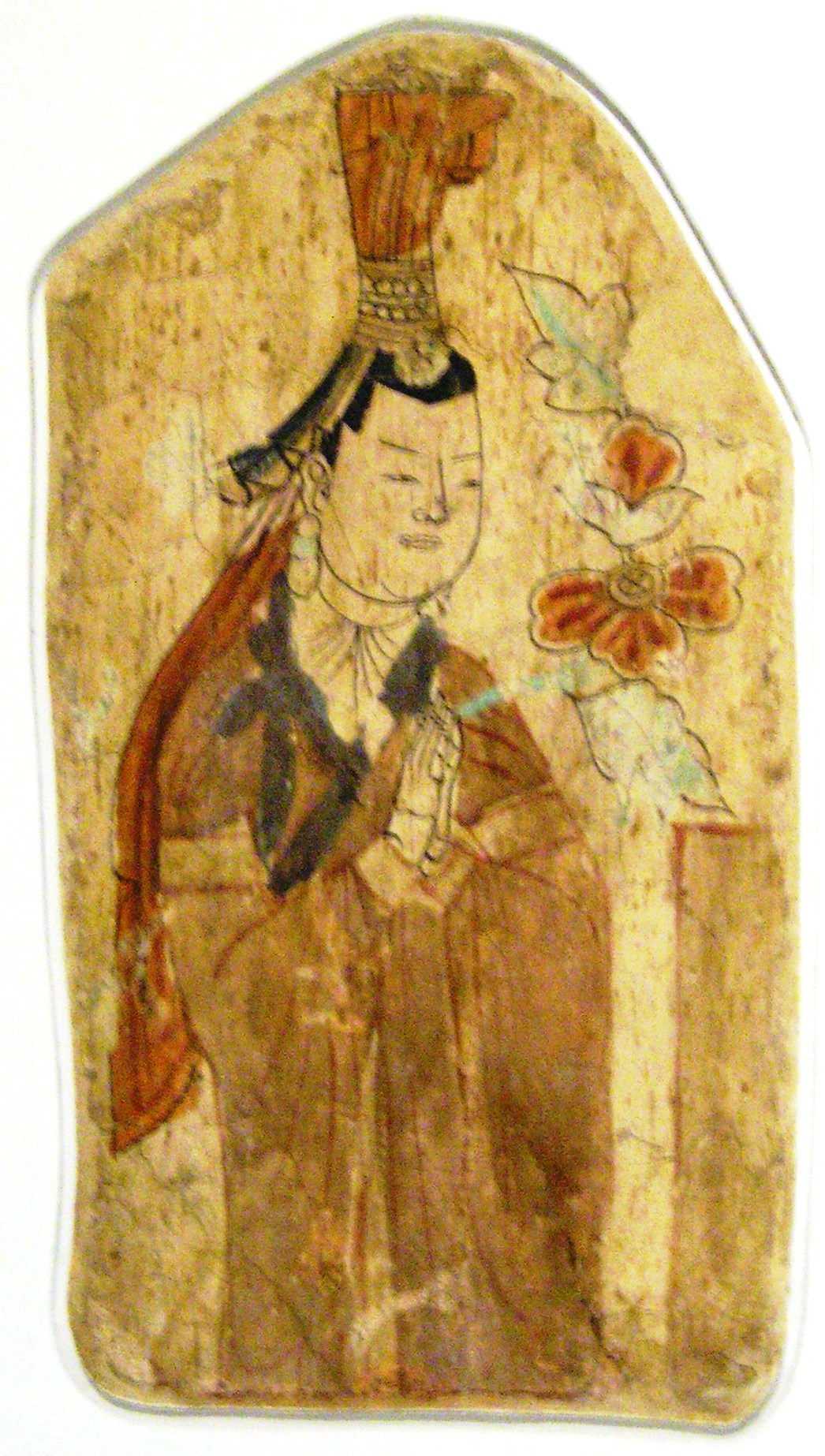
Old Uyghur donor from the Bezeklik murals.

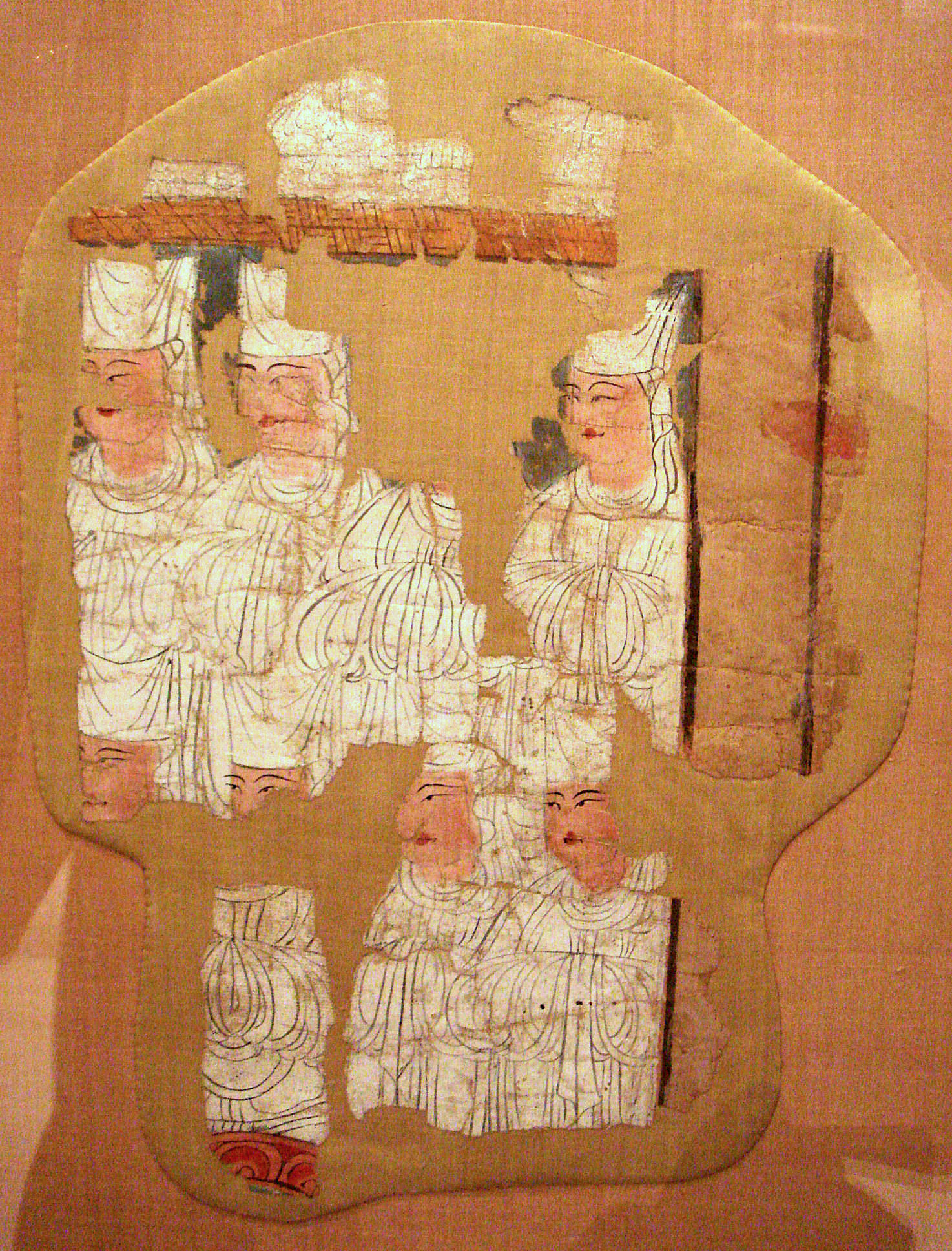
Old Uyghur Manichaean Electae from Qocho.

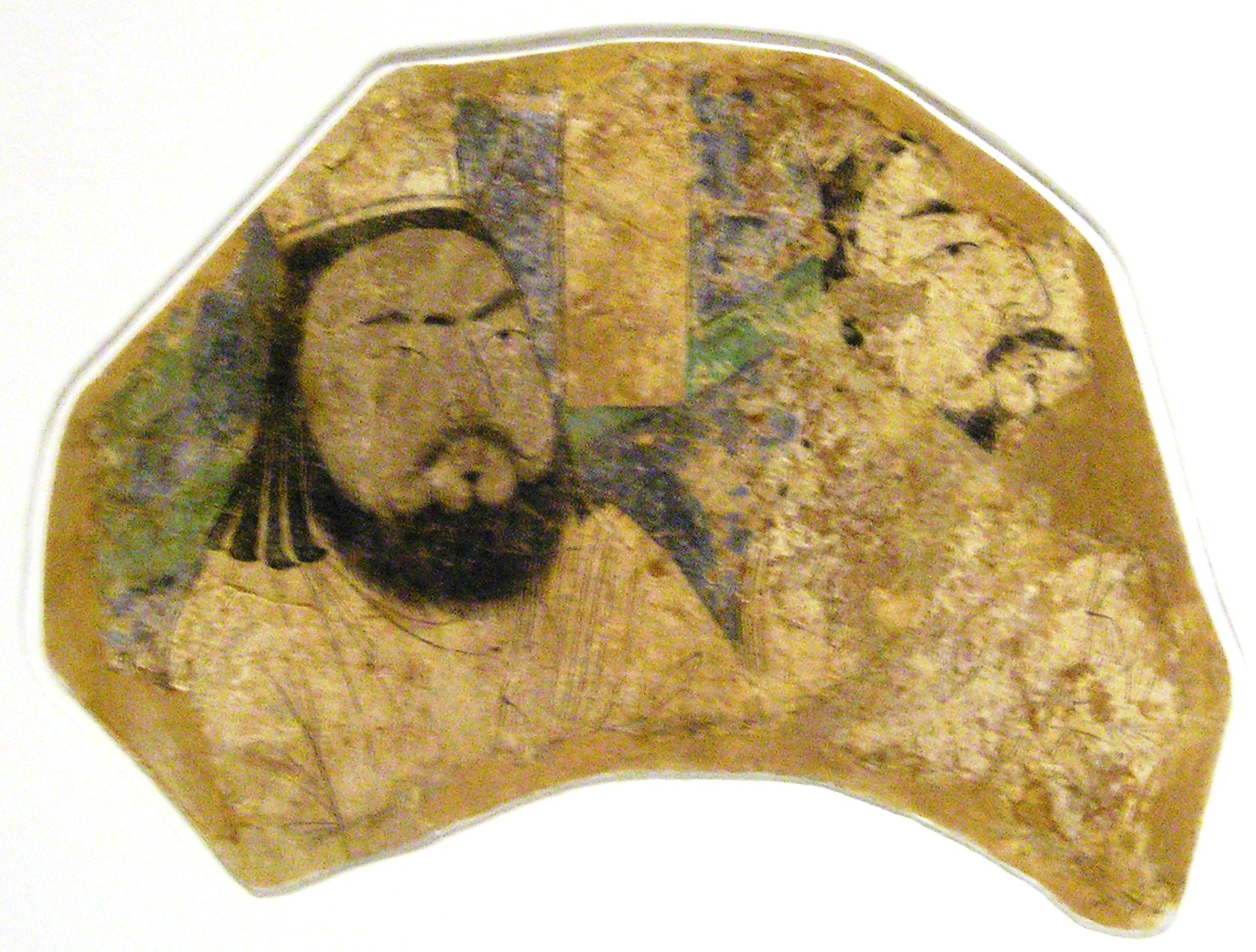
Old Uyghur Manichaean clergymen from Qocho.

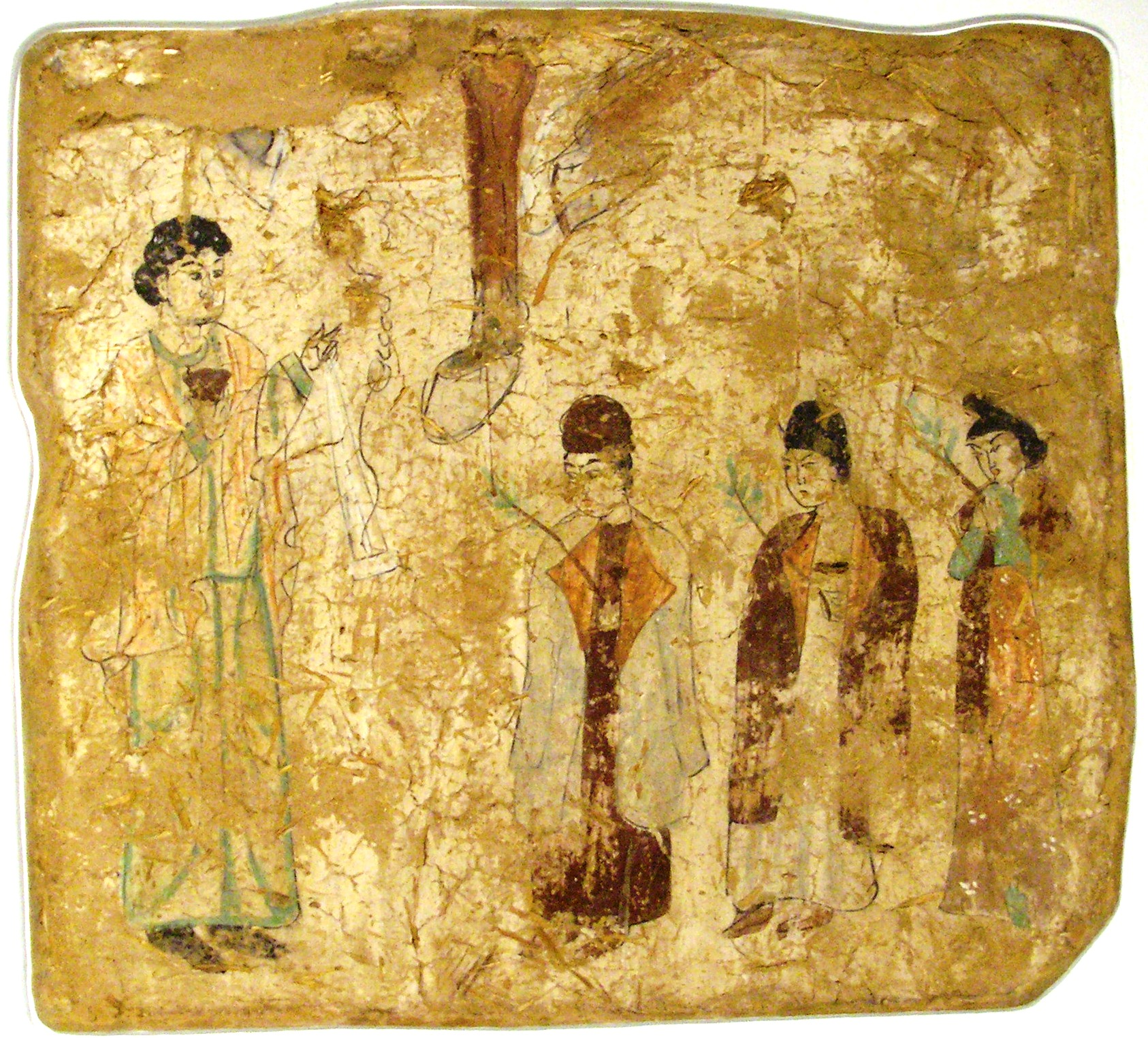
Fresco of Palm Sunday from Qocho.

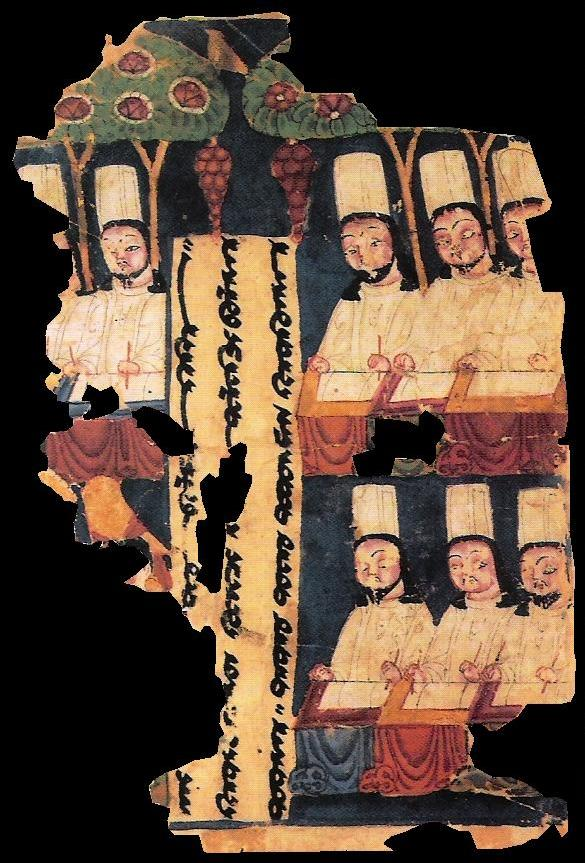
Manicheans from Qocho

=== Medieval times ===
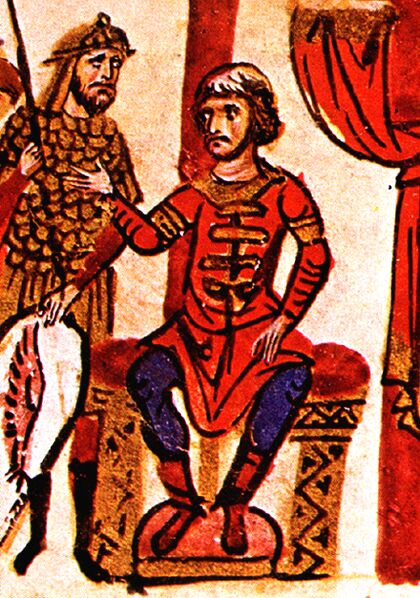
Khan Omurtag of Bulgaria, from the Chronicle of John Skylitzes.

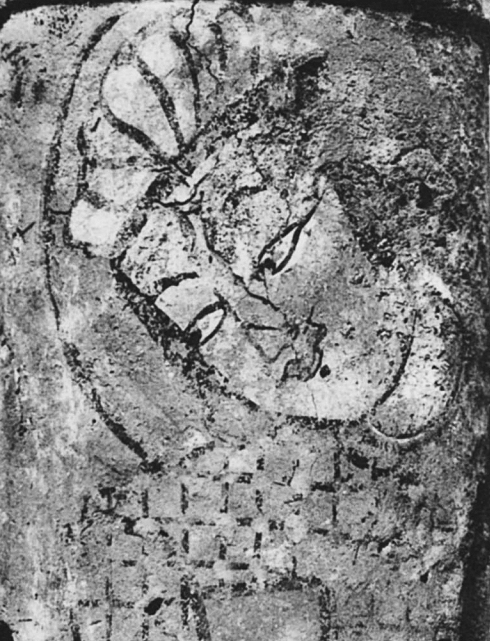
Ghaznavid portrait, Palace of Lashkari Bazar.

=== Modern times ===
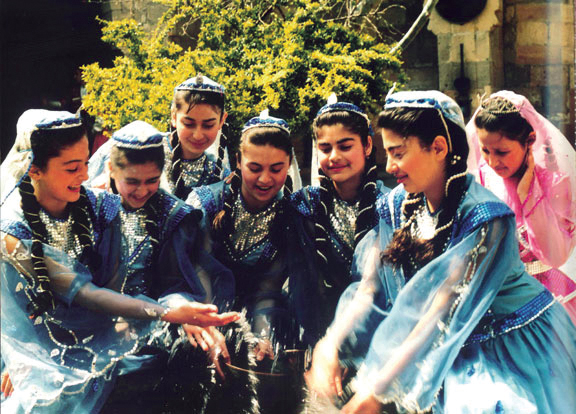
Azerbaijani girls in traditional dress.

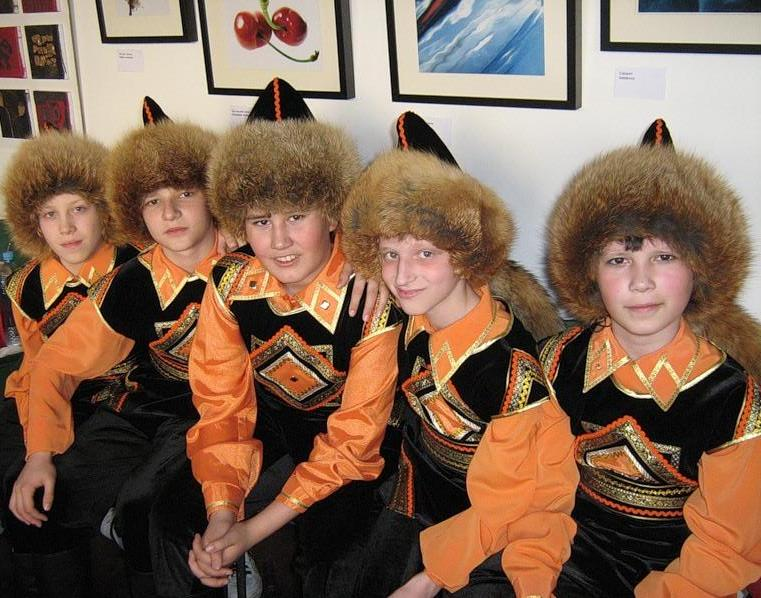
Bashkir boys in national dress.

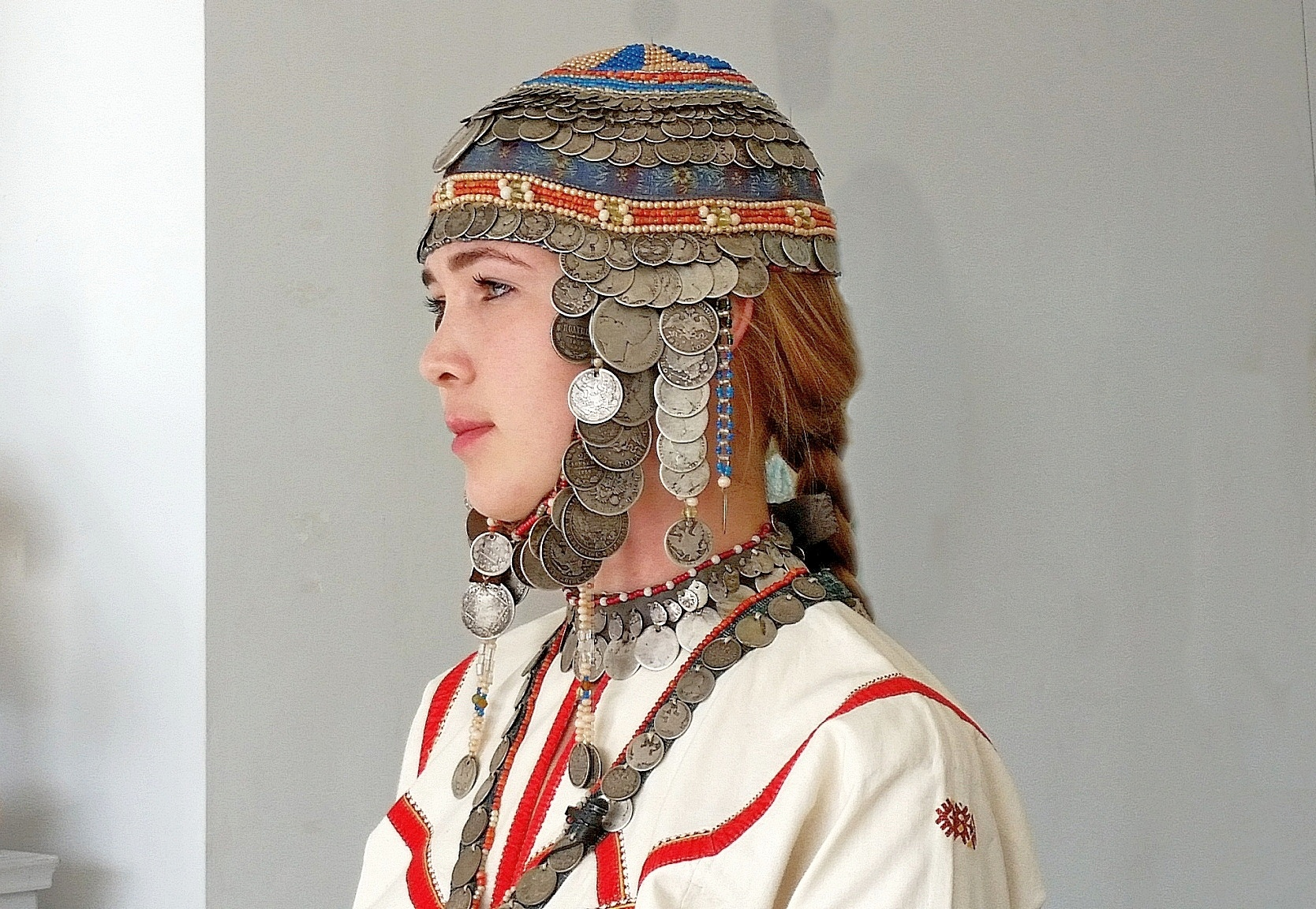
A Chuvash girl in traditional dress.

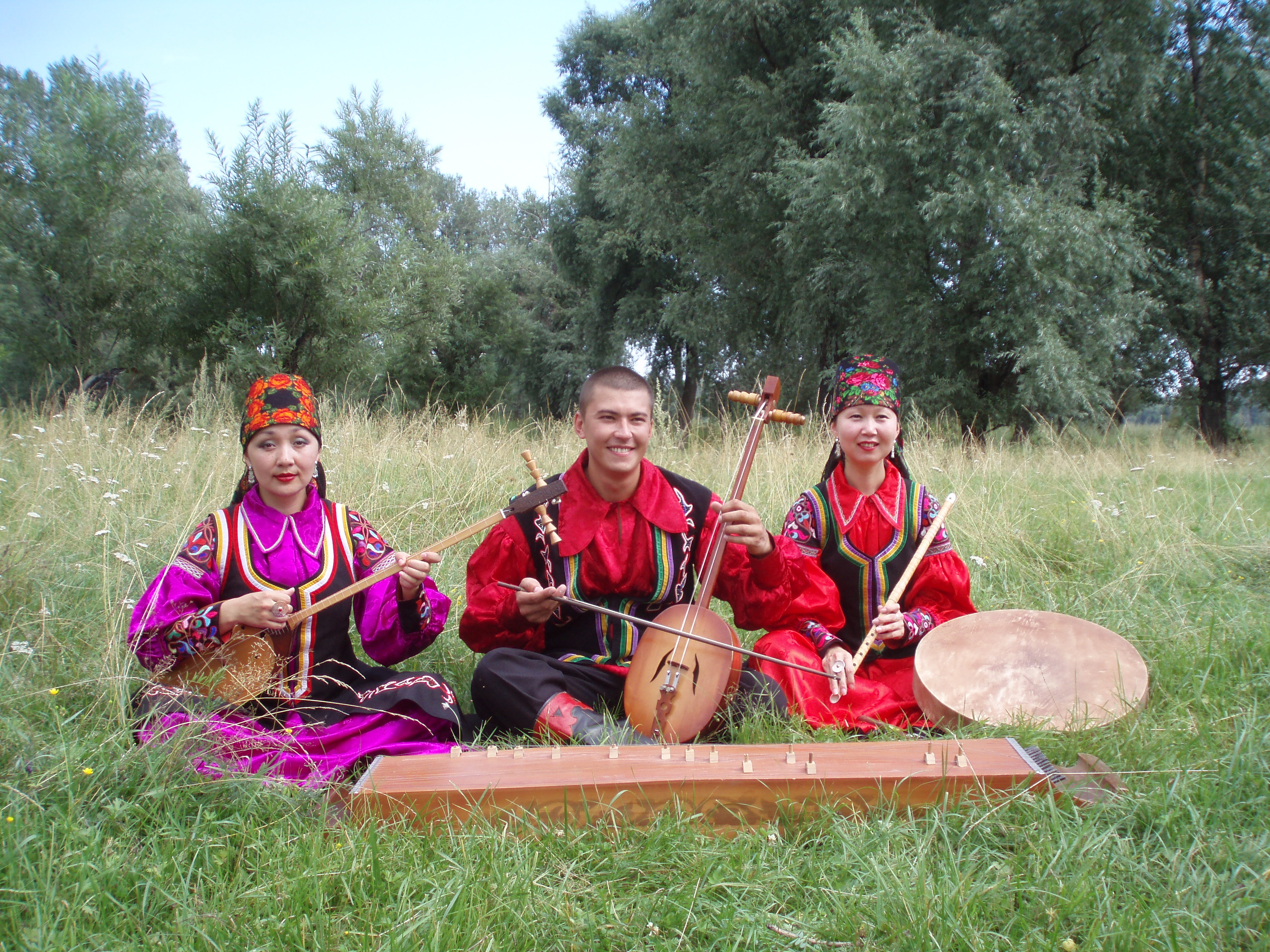
Khakas people with traditional instruments.

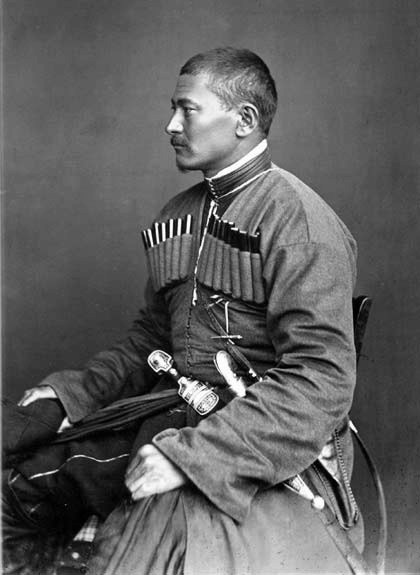
Nogai man in national costume.

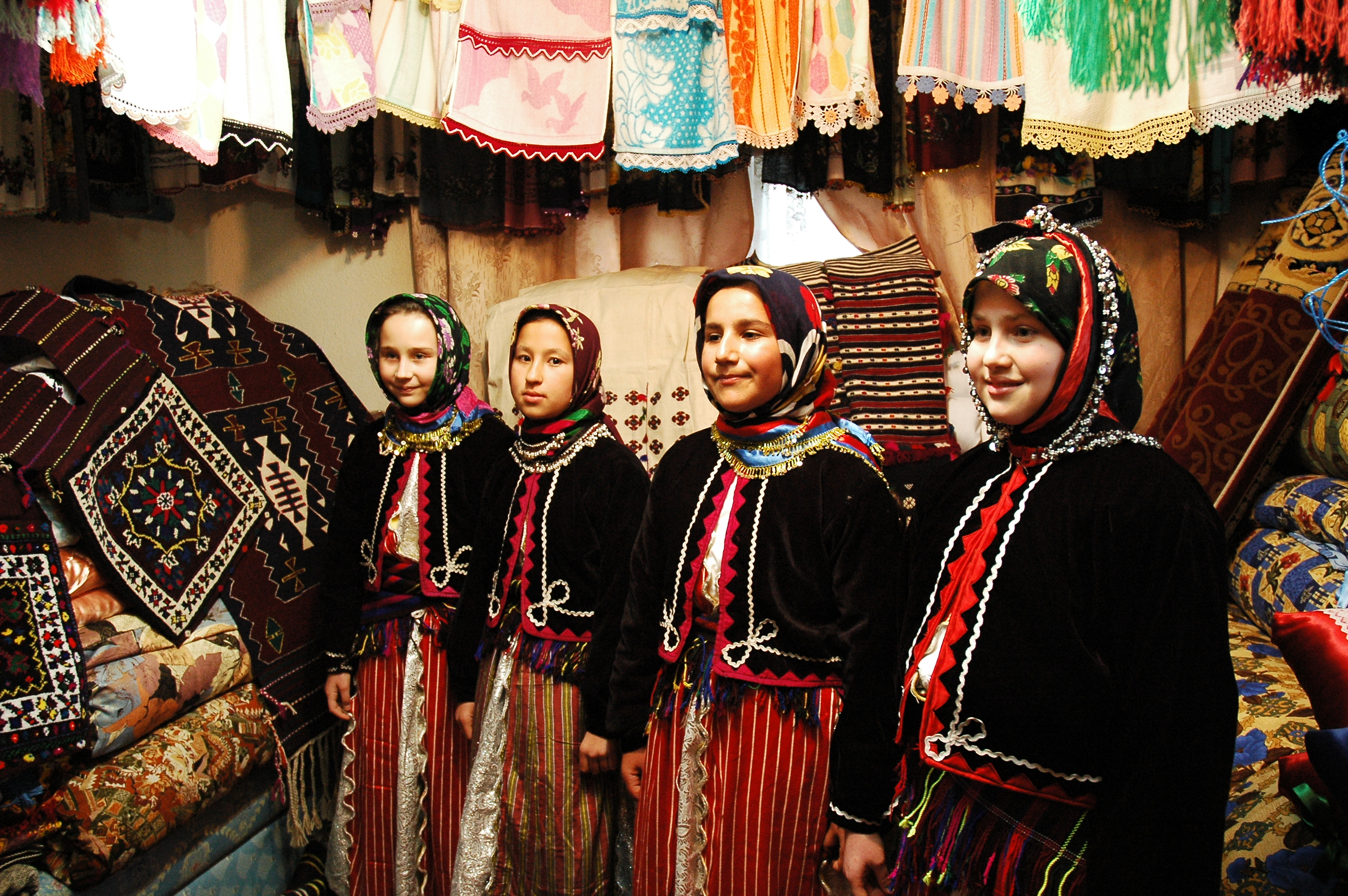
Turkish girls in their traditional clothes, Dursunbey, Balikesir Province.

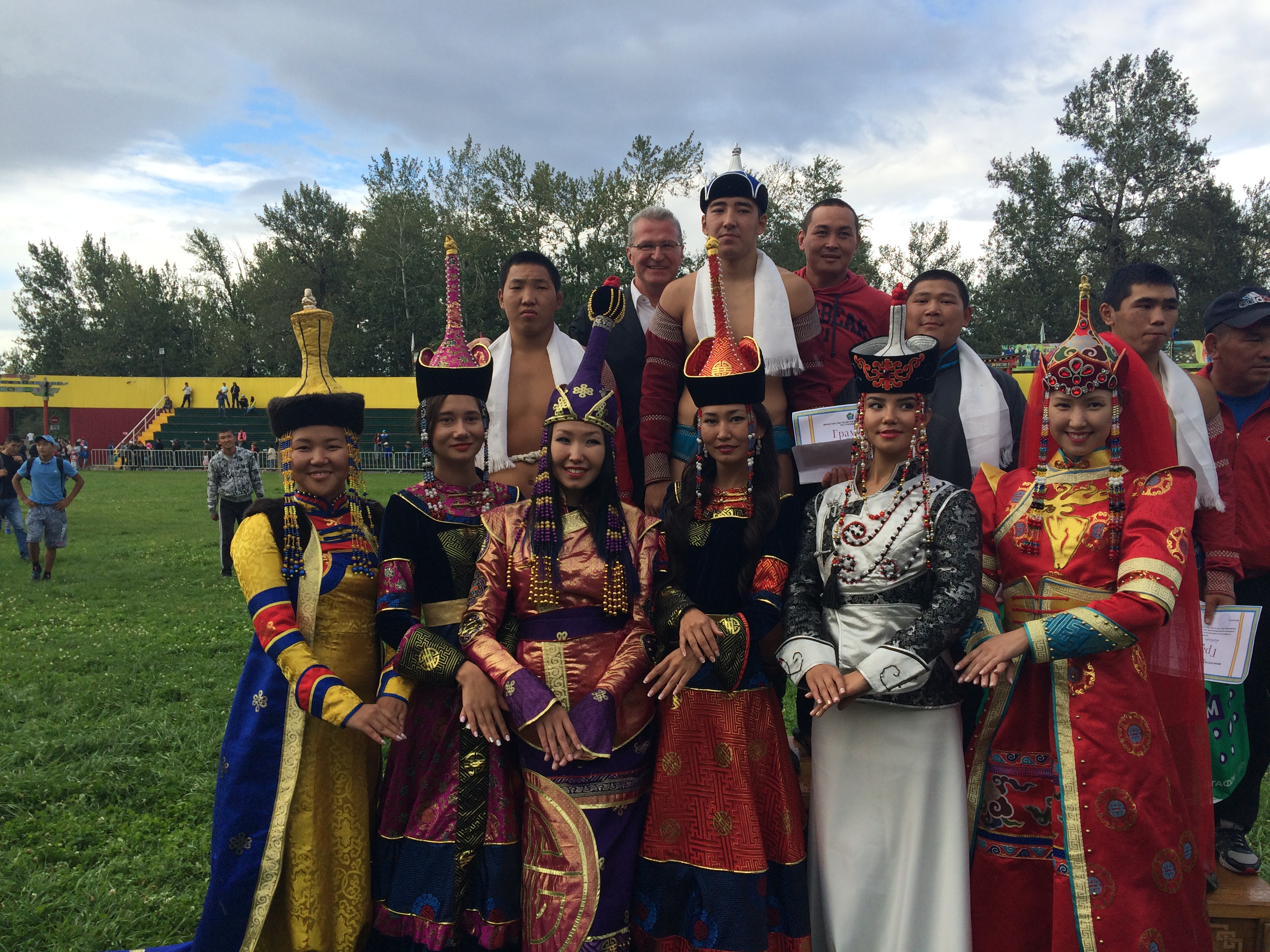
Tuvan men and women in Kyzyl, Tuva.

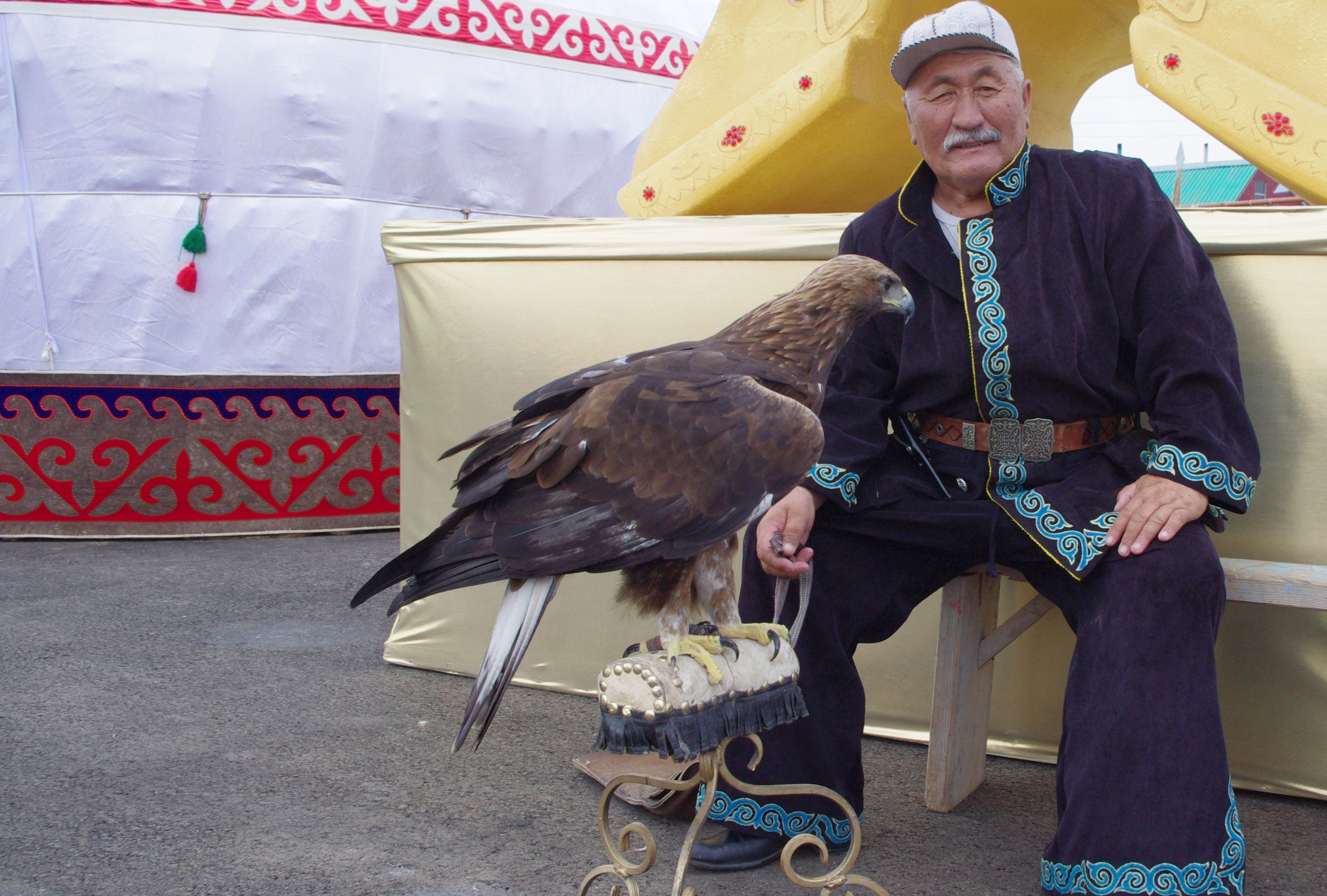
Kazakh man in traditional clothing.

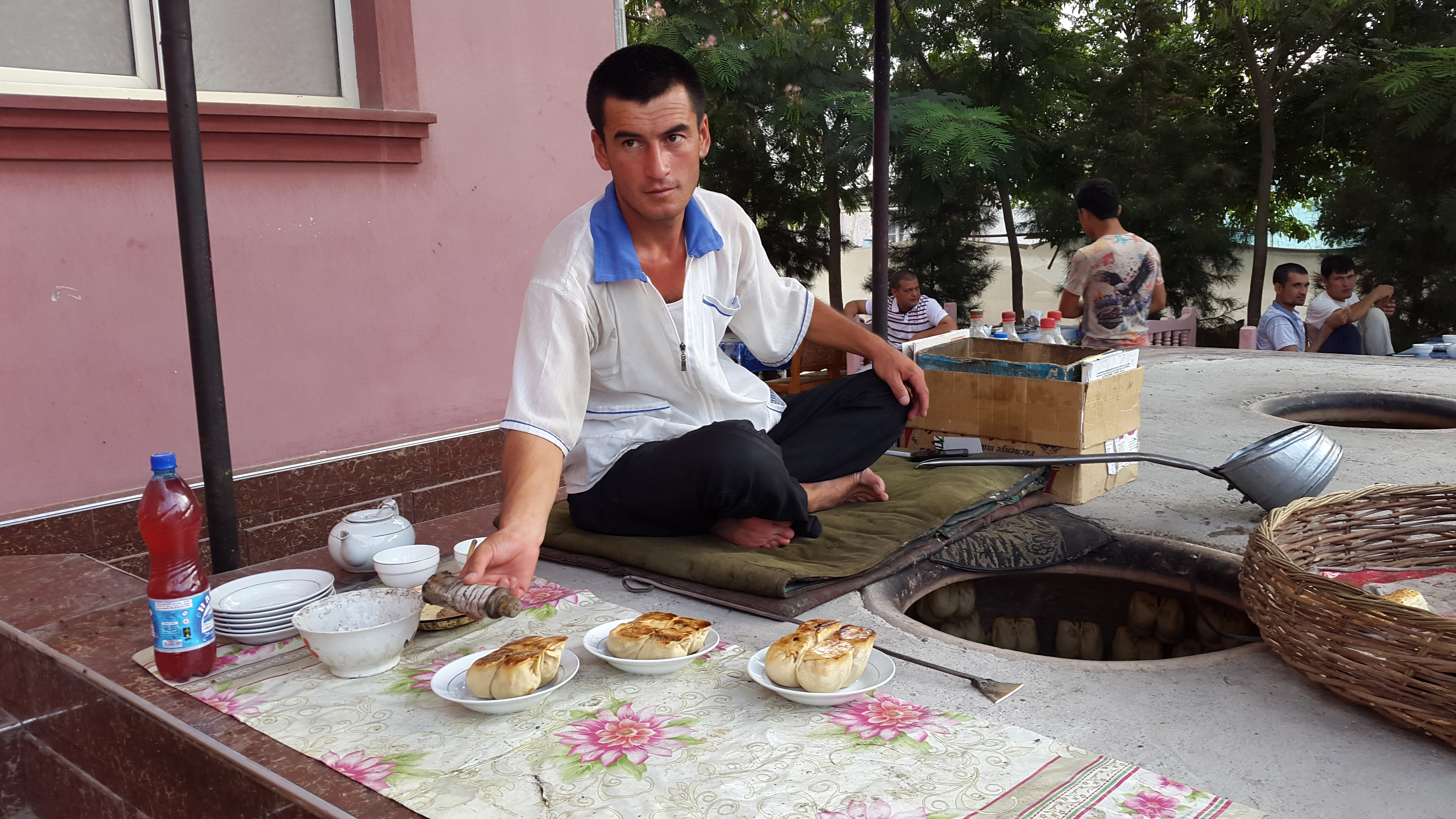
Uzbek with traditional cuisine.

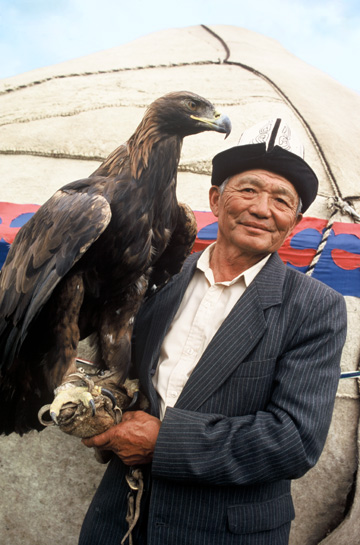
Kyrgyz traditional eagle hunter.

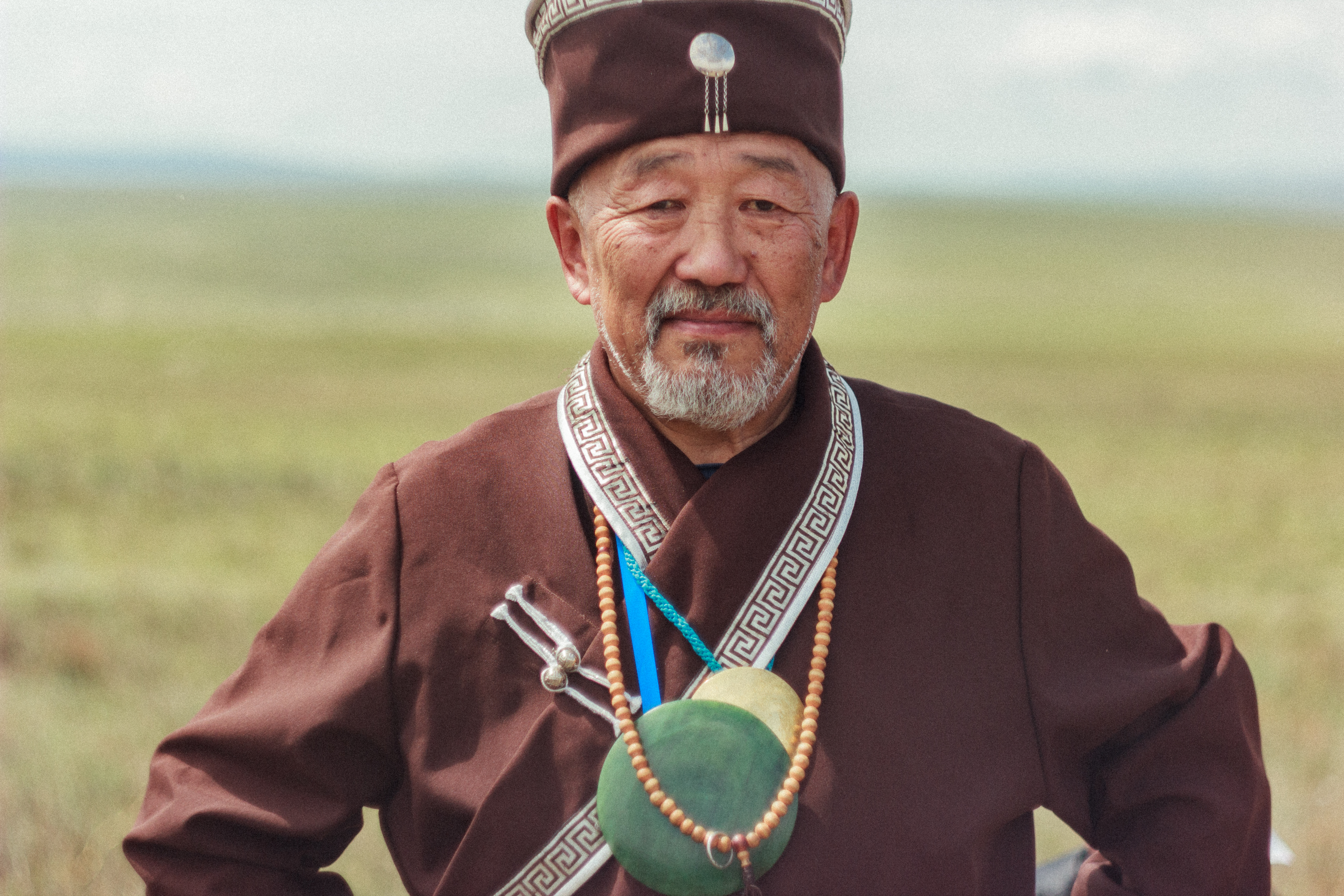
Tuvan traditional shaman.

== See also ==
- Turkic history
- Turkic migration
- Turkic mythology
- Turco-Persian tradition
- Turco-Mongol tradition
- Turkology

== Sources ==
- Baydar, Ayça (2016). "Chapter One – Introduction". The Turcophone Orthodox Christians from Coexistence to Ethno-religious Homogenisation: A study of the 'Karamanlidhika' Press during the Greek-Turkish War and the Population Exchange (Thesis). University of London. pp. 9–33.
- Brook, Kevin Alan (2018), The Jews of Khazaria, Rowman & Littlefield
- "Turkic peoples". Encyclopædia Britannica. Encyclopædia Britannica, Inc..
- Damgaard, P. B.; et al. (9 May 2018). "137 ancient human genomes from across the Eurasian steppes". Nature. 557 (7705). Nature Research: 369–373. Bibcode:2018Natur.557..369D. doi:10.1038/s41586-018-0094-2. hdl:1887/3202709. PMID 29743675. S2CID 13670282.
- Dickens, Mark (2018). "Scythians (Saka)". In Nicholson, Oliver (ed.). The Oxford Dictionary of Late Antiquity. Oxford University Press. pp. 1346–1347. ISBN 978-0-19-174445-7.
- Findley, Carter V. (2005). The Turks in World History. Oxford University Press, USA. ISBN 978-0-19-517726-8.
- Fisher, William Bayne; Avery, P.; Hambly, G. R. G; Melville, C. (1991). The Cambridge History of Iran. Vol. 7. Cambridge: Cambridge University Press. ISBN 978-0-521-20095-0.
- Golden, Peter Benjamin (2011). Studies on the peoples and cultures of the Eurasian steppes. Bucureşti: Ed. Acad. Române. ISBN 978-973-1871-96-7.
- Ivantchik, Askold (2018). "Scythians". Encyclopædia Iranica. New York City, United States: Encyclopædia Iranica Foundation; Brill Publishers.
- Janhunen, Juha (2003). "Ethnicity and language in prehistoric Northeast Asia". In Blench, Roger; Spriggs, Matthew (eds.). Archaeology and Language II: Archaeological Data and Linguistic Hypotheses. One World Archaeology. Vol. 29. Routledge. pp. 195–208. ISBN 0-415-11761-5.
- Khanbaghi, Aptin (2006). The Fire, the Star and the Cross: Minority Religions in Medieval and Early Modern Iran. I.B. Tauris. ISBN 978-1-84511-056-7.
- Lee, Joo-Yup; Kuang, Shuntu (18 October 2017). "A Comparative Analysis of Chinese Historical Sources and Y-DNA Studies with Regard to the Early and Medieval Turkic Peoples". Inner Asia. 19 (2). Brill: 197–239. doi:10.1163/22105018-12340089. ISSN 2210-5018.
- Lee, Joo-Yup (2023). The Turkic Peoples in World History. Routledge. doi:10.4324/9781003256496. ISBN 978-1-000-90421-5.
- Li, Tao; et al. (June 2020). "Millet agriculture dispersed from Northeast China to the Russian Far East: Integrating archaeology, genetics, and linguistics". Archaeological Research in Asia. 22 100177. Elsevier. doi:10.1016/j.ara.2020.100177. hdl:21.11116/0000-0005-D82B-8.
- Mecit, Songül (2014). The Rum Seljuqs: Evolution of a Dynasty. Routledge. ISBN 978-1-134-50899-0.
- Nelson, Sarah; et al. (14 February 2020). "Tracing population movements in ancient East Asia through the linguistics and archaeology of textile production". Evolutionary Human Sciences. 2 (e5). Cambridge University Press: e5. doi:10.1017/ehs.2020.4. PMC 10427276. PMID 37588355.
- Peacock, A.C.S.; Yıldız, Sara Nur, eds. (2013). The Seljuks of Anatolia: Court and Society in the Medieval Middle East. I.B.Tauris. ISBN 978-1-84885-887-9.
- Robbeets, Martine (1 January 2017). "Austronesian influence and Transeurasian ancestry in Japanese". Language Dynamics and Change. 8 (2). Brill: 210–251. doi:10.1163/22105832-00702005. hdl:11858/00-001M-0000-002E-8635-7. ISSN 2210-5832.
- Robbeets, Martine (2020). "The Transeurasian homeland: where, what and when?". In Robbeets, Martine; Savelyev, Alexander (eds.). The Oxford Guide to the Transeurasian Languages. Oxford University Press. ISBN 978-0-19-880462-8.
- Tekin, Talat (1993). Irk bitig (the book of omens) (PDF). Wiesbaden: Otto Harrassowitz. ISBN 978-3-447-03426-5.
- Uchiyama, Junzo; et al. (21 May 2020). "Populations dynamics in Northern Eurasian forests: a long-term perspective from Northeast Asia". Evolutionary Human Sciences. 2 e16. Cambridge University Press. doi:10.1017/ehs.2020.11. PMC 10427466. PMID 37588381. Text was copied from this source, which is available under a Creative Commons Attribution 4.0 International License.
- de la Vaissière, Étienne (2015). "The Steppe World and the Rise of the Huns". In Maas, Michael (ed.). The Cambridge Companion to the Age of Attila. Cambridge University Press. pp. 175–192. ISBN 978-1-107-63388-9.
- Yang, Xiao-Min; Meng, Hai-Liang; Zhang, Jian-Lin (17 November 2023). "Ancient genome of Empress Ashina reveals the Northeast Asian origin of Göktürk Khanate". Journal of Systematics and Evolution. 61 (6): 1056–1064. Bibcode:2023JSyEv..61.1056Y. doi:10.1111/jse.12938. ISSN 1674-4918. S2CID 255690237.
- Yarshater, Ehsan (2001). Encyclopedia Iranica. Routledge & Kegan Paul. ISBN 978-0-933273-56-6.
- Yunusbayev, Bayazit; et al. (21 April 2015). "The Genetic Legacy of the Expansion of Turkic-Speaking Nomads across Eurasia". PLOS One. 11 (4) e1005068. PLOS. doi:10.1371/journal.pgen.1005068. PMC 4405460. PMID 25898006.
