= Kimak–Kipchak confederation =

Medieval Turkic state formed by the Kimak and Kipchak people

Kimak confederation
- 880–1035
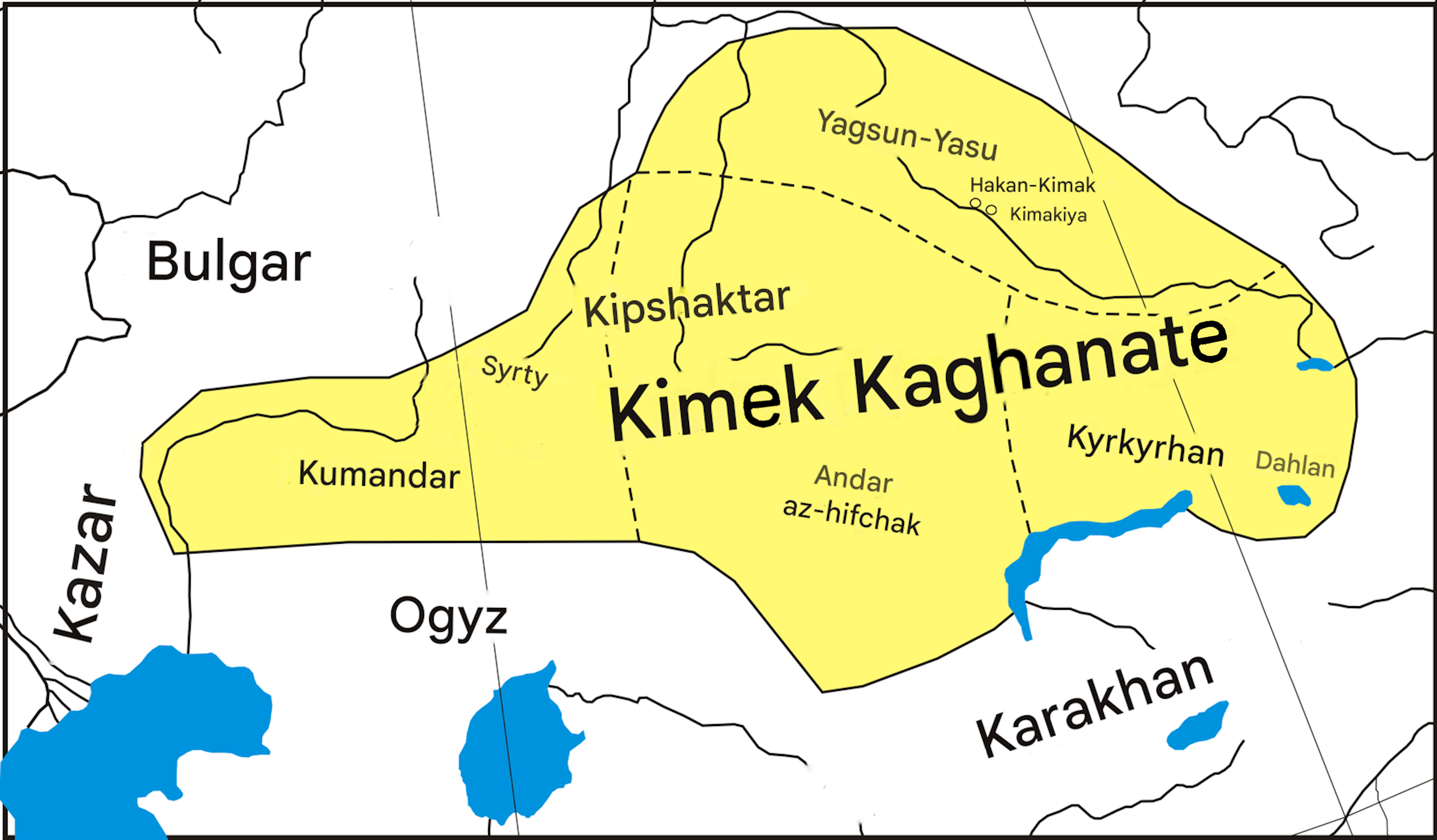
- Status: Tribal confederation
- Capital: Khakan-Kimak (in winter), Imakia (in summer)
- Religion: Shamanism, Tengrism, Nestorianism, Buddhism, Islam
- Khagan
- History
  - Established: 880
  - Disestablished: 1035
Preceded by	Succeeded by
Second Turkic Khaganate; Oghuz Yabgu State	Cumania

The Kimak–Kipchak confederation (Note: The ethnonym is also sometimes spelt Kimek, while the state is called a "khanate" and "khaganate".) was a medieval Turkic state formed by seven peoples, including the Kimaks and Kipchaks, in the area between the Ob and Irtysh rivers.

== Name ==
Minorsky, citing Marquart, Barthold, Semenov and other sources, proposes that the name Kīmāk (pronounced Kimäk) is derived from Iki-Imäk, "the two Imäk", probably referring to the first two clans (Īmī and Īmāk) of the federation.

On the other hand, Pritsak attempted to connect the Kimek with the Proto-Mongolic Kumo of the Kumo Xi confederation (庫莫奚; Middle Chinese: kʰuo^{H}-mɑk̚-ɦei; *qu(o)mâġ-ġay, from *quo "yellowish" plus denominal suffix *-mAk); Golden judges Pritsak's reconstruction "highly problematic", as Pritsak did not explain how Quomâġ might have produced Kimek; still, Golden considers the connection with the Proto-Mongolic world seriously.

Mahmud al-Kashgari does not mention any Kimek, but Yamāk; Kashgari further remarked that Kara-Khanids like him considered Yemeks to be "a tribe of the Kipchaks", though contemporary Kipchaks considered themselves a different party. The ethnonym Yemäk might have been transcribed in the mid 7th century by Chinese authors as 鹽莫 Yánmò < Middle Chinese *jiäm-mâk, referring to a Tiele group who initially inhabited northwestern Mongolia before migrating to north of Altay Mountains and Irtysh zone. (Note: 鹽莫 Yánmò, from MC *jiäm-mâk, should not be confused with 燕末 Yànmò, from MC ʔen^{H}-muɑt̚ (ZS) / *ˀien-muât (Zuev). 燕末 Yànmò, the residence of Xueyantuo Khagan Yağmurçin, is identified by Cen Zhongmian with the toponym Ïbar Baş (OTrk 𐰃𐰉𐰺𐱈) mentioned in Tonyukuk inscriptions)

Initially, Golden (1992:202, 227, 263) accepted the identification of Kimeks with Imeks/Yimeks/Yemeks, because the /k/ > ∅, resulting in Kimek > İmek, was indeed attested in several Medieval Kipchak dialects; Golden also thought Yemeks unlikely to be 鹽莫 *jiäm-mâk > Yánmò in Chinese source. However, Golden later changed his mind, reasoning that, as the Medieval Kipchak dialectal sound-change /k/ > ∅ had not yet happened in the mid-7th century Old Turkic, the identification of Yemeks with Kimeks is disputed. As a result, Golden (2002:660-665) later abandons the Kimeks > Yemeks identification and becomes more amenable to the identification of 鹽莫 Yánmò with Yemeks, by scholars such as Hambis, Zuev, and Kumekov, cited in Golden (1992:202).

According to Tishin (2018), Yemeks were simply the most important of the seven constituent tribes whose representatives met at the Irtysh valley, where the diverse Kimek tribal union emerged, as related by Gardizi.

== Origin ==
The Kimek confederation originated as a tribal union of seven tribes or clans. These tribes originated in the steppes of eastern Central Asia. The bulk of these migrated to present-day Kazakhstan after the destruction of the Uyghur Khaganate (840). The Kimek state was formed at the end of the 9th and beginning of the 10th century composed out of tribal domains, ruled by a khagan who was the supreme among subject leaders.

== Historical background ==
The 10th century geographical treaty Hudud al-Alam gave a description of the cultures and ways of life of Kimeks and Kipchaks. The Kimaks led a semi-settled life, as the Hudūd mentioned many wandering tribal grazers as well as a town named *Yimäkiya (> Yamakkiyya > ms. Namakiyya); while the Kipchaks, in some customs, resembled the contemporary Oghuzes, who were nomadic herders. The southern neighbors of Kimaks were Karluks, who preserved their independence for another 200 years. The Kimak Khakan's residence was in the city Imakia (Pavlodar, Kazakhstan) on the Irtysh.

In the middle of the 7th century, one of the future Kimek confederation's constituent tribes, the Yemaks, lived near the Irtysh, north of the Altai, as part of the Western Turkic Khaganate, and were possibly known to the Chinese as 鹽莫 Yánmò (< Middle Chinese *jiäm-mâk). After the disintegration of the Western Türkic Kaganate in 743, a part of the Kimaks remained in its successor, the Uyghur Kaganate (740–840), (Note: in his 10th century work The Meadows of Gold al-Masudi mentioned the Kmâk yyġûr (variant Kmâk byġûr), which possibly transcribes the tribal name Kimek Yiğur, of Uyghurs who'd later seek refuge with the Kimeks) and another part retained their independence. Lev Gumilyov connects the Kimek to Western Turk tribe Chumukun (處木昆): as Kimaks were known only to Arabs and Persians with Chumukun only known to Chinese. During that period a nucleus of the Kimak confederation's tribes was consolidated. The head of the Kimak confederation had the title shad tutuk, i.e., "Prince Governing, or Ruling". The Yemek tribe became the head of the union, and later of the Kimak Kaganate. According to Pritsak (1982:331-333), Kimeks were known to Chinese as 庫莫 Kumo < MC kʰuoH-mɑk̚ < *qu(o)mâġ associated with the Xi < *ɦei < *Ġay, a people whom Islamic writers knew as Qay and whose ethnonym is often linked to Mongolic *mogaï "snake" (Khalkha могой mogoj). Pletnyova proposed that "A snake has seven heads"/"A dragon with seven heads", recorded by Kashgari reflects the consolidation of the Kimek confederation. However, Golden (1992) found no textual evidence to link qay with Mongolic *mogaï. Golden, following Klyashtorny, contended that the Qays' identification as the "People of the Snake", or rather "People of the Chieftain named Snake/Dragon", actually resulted from Qays' participation in an anti-Karakhanid coalition led by Yabaku chieftain Budrach, whose epithet Böke means "Great Dragon / Great Snake".

Before the middle of the 8th century, the Kimaks bordered the Karluks and Tokuz-Oguzes on the south, and the Yenisei Kyrgyz on the east. After the dissolution of the Western Turkic Khaganate in 743, the main body of the Kimaks remained in the Irtysh area. In the late 8th or early 9th century, part of the Kimak tribes migrated in two directions, northwest to the Urals and southwest to the northern Zhetysu. The migration changed the ethnic composition of the Middle Volga and Lower Kama areas in the west. Spreading from the Irtysh area, Kimaks occupied territory between the rivers Yaik and Emba, and between the Aral and Caspian steppes, to the Zhetysu area.

Between the 9th and 11th century the Kimek were concentrated in the middle Irtysh basin and northeastern Semirechye.

== History ==
=== 9th and 10th century ===
After the breakup of the Uyghur Khaganate in 840, the Central Asian tribes found themselves unattached. Portions of the Turkic Eymür, Bayandur, and Shiwei Tatar tribes joined the core of the Kimak tribes. The Tatar tribes were already members of the Kimak confederation — some had already participated in the initial formation of the Kimak Kaganate. The Kipchaks also had their Khanlyk, but politically they were dependent on the Kimaks. The dominating Kimak tribe mostly lived on the banks of the Irtysh. The Kipchaks, described by Hudud al-Alam, occupied a separate territory located to the west, approximately in the southeastern part of the Southern Urals. Chinese chroniclers wrote about the mountains of the Kipchak land—in the chronicle Yuanshi, these mountains are named Yùlǐbólǐ (玉里伯里), and the Kipchaks are called Qīnchá 欽察. North of the Kipchaks and the Kimaks lay endless forest.

Of all the numerous tribes, the Kimaks were ready to head a new political tribal union. They created a new Kimak Kaganate state, a federation of seven tribes, seven Khanlyks. Abu Said Gardezi (d. 1061) wrote that the Kimak state incorporated seven related tribes: Yemeks, Kipchaks, Eymür, Tatar, Bayandur, Lanikaz, and Ajlad. At its height, the Kimak Kaganate had 12 nuclear tribes, extending from the Irtysh river and Altai mountains in the east to the Black Sea steppe in the west, into the taiga fringes in the north, and southward into the desert-steppe. After their decline, the Jeti-Su Kimaks retreated to the upper Irtysh region, and the western Kipchak-Kimaks settled in the North Pontic steppes. The Kimaks were originally Tengrians, with possibly some Nestorian Christian communities. In the 11th century, Islam made some inroads.

Arab and Persian geographers, travelers, and historians provide an abundance of information about the Kimaks. In 821 the Arab Tamim ibn Bahr traveled to Tokuz-Oguzes through Kimak and Kipchak lands. His descriptions were later used by other authors. The Persian traveler Gardezi recorded the Kimaks, noting that their location was previously on record as the territory of the people called by the Chinese authors "Chumukun".

In the 9th century, the Kimaks allied with the Oguz. In the second half of the 9th century, the reinforced Kimaks began drifting westwards. They occupied the lands of the Pecheneg (Besenyo, Badjinak, Patsinak, Pecheneg, called by the Arabs "Badjnaks", and by the Byzantines "Patsinaks"), nomadic cattle breeders whose nucleus was the tribes of the Kangar union. The Pecheneg position worsened; their union was defeated by an alliance of Oguzes, Kimaks, and Karluks. Kimaks, together with Oguzes, seized Kangar Pecheneg lands along the Seyhun (Syr-Darya) and in the Aral area, taking over the pastures in the Southern Urals.

Under pressure of Kimaks, the Pecheneg moved from the Aral to the Lower Itil steppes, and from there on to the Don-Dnieper interfluvial, pushing the Magyars westward. At the end of the 9th century in the south of the Eastern European steppes formed a new nomadic union of Pechenegs. Their neighbors were stronger and better known people: Oghuzes, Kipchaks, Magyars, and the Khazar Kaganate. Under pressure from joint assaults by Cuman/Kipchaks and their linguistic Oghuz cousins of the Kimek Khaganate, and taking advantage of the weakness of the Khazar Kaganate, the Pecheneg moved through its territory to the west, bringing destruction to the settled populations of Bulgars and Alans in the N.Caucasus.

In the 10th century, the Kimek were allied with the Oghuzes. In his 10th century work, Ibn Haukal drew a map showing that Kipchak-Kimak tribes together with Oghuzes pastured in the steppes north of the Aral Sea, and al-Masudi at approximately the same time wrote that all of them were coaching along Emba and Yaik. In the Middle East, the Cuman–Kipchak country began to be called Desht-i-Kipchak and Cumania. Al-Biruni noted that Oghuzes quite often pastured in the country of Kimek. Some clans of the Kimak tribes quite often lived along the coast of the Caspian Sea: "Shahname" even calls that sea the Kimak Sea. The main western neighbors of Kimek-Kipchaks in the 10th century were Bashkirs, with whom at that time the westernmost Kipchak clans established very close contacts.

They dominated the heartland of Asia, controlled a key central portion of the Silk Road, and influenced events from China to Persia and Europe, on a par with the Scythians and Mongols. The Kimak polity may be seen as one of the great pastoral, nomadic empires of all time.

At the end of the 10th century, not only were the Caliphate writers and scientists knowledgeable about them, but in the Central Asian states, journeys to the Kimak country were well known and discussed in the markets and chaihanas (tea houses).

The Kimeks were ruled by a "Kagan, also called "Khakan" in the eastern records, not of the Ashina dynasty. In the 10th and 11th centuries, the ruling clan was the Tatar. Later they appear to have been ruled by the Ilbari clan.

During the 10th century the Kipchaks became independent within the Kaganate (if they were ever dependent in the first place) and began migrating westward. The zenith of Kimak power came under the Ilburi rulers near the end of the 12th century. In 1183, the Kimaks attacked Volga Bulgaria, and they twice sacked Khwarezm in 1152 and 1197.

=== Decline ===
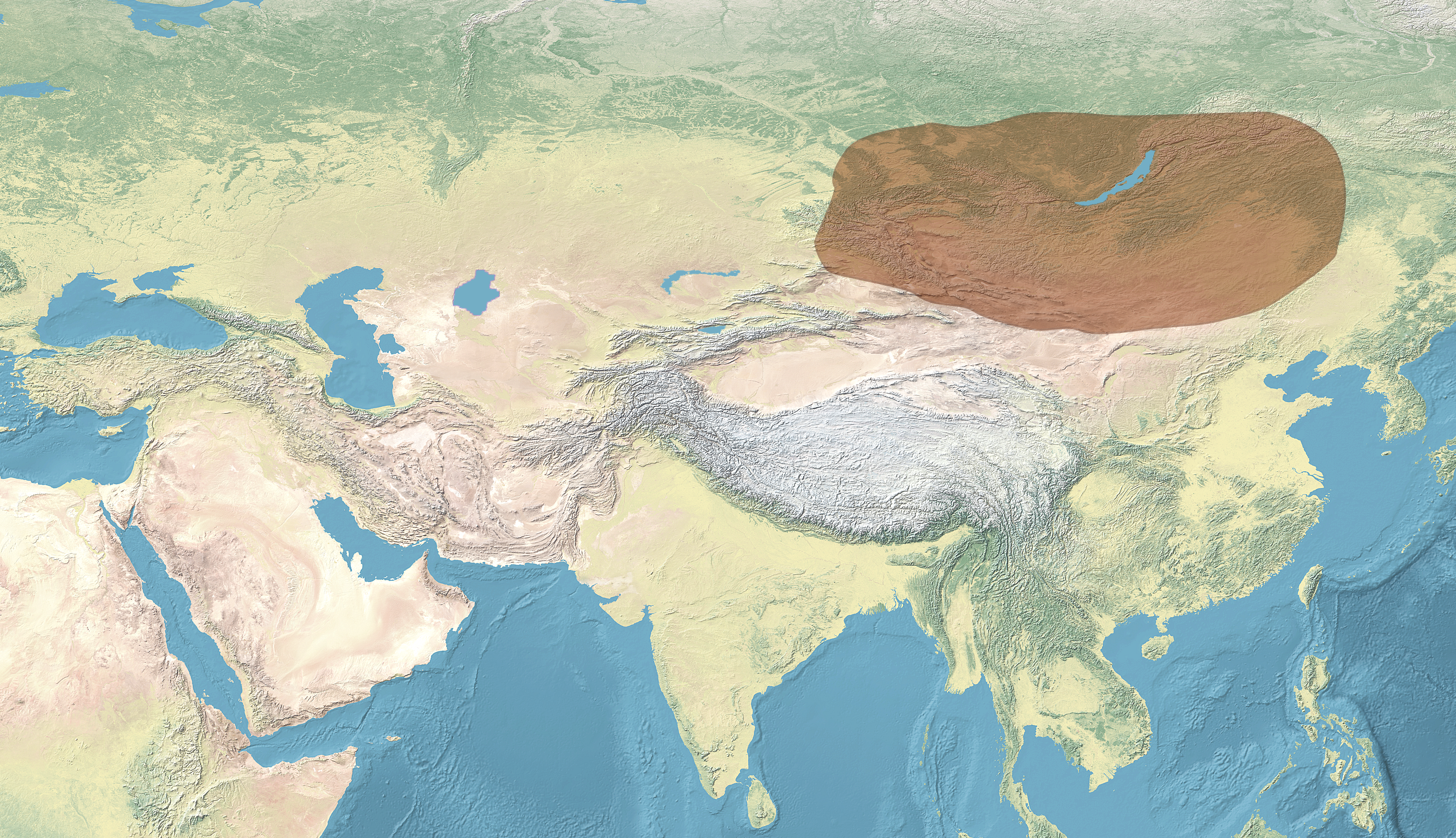
The Kimek–Kipchaks and the Mongol homeland in continental Asia c. 1200.

The Kimak federation occupied a huge territory from the Tobol and Irtysh rivers to the Caspian Sea and Syr-Darya. The northern border of the Kimak federation was the Siberian taiga, the eastern border was the Altai Mountains and the southern border was the lifeless steppe of Bet Pak. The borders naturally protecting them from their enemies, the Kimaks lived undisturbed. Their neighbors were Karluks, Oguzes and Kyrgyz. Kimaks, Kipchaks, Oguzes, Petchenegs, Ugrians and other peoples and ethnic groups of the multi-ethnic Kimak Kaganate lived peacefully and prosperously.

At the beginning of the 11th century, the Kimaks and Kipchaks pushed the Oguzes to the south, the Petchenegs to the west, the Karluks to the southeast and the Ugrians to the north into the Siberian taiga, and became owners of the ancient Kangju. Individual Khanlyks of the Kimak Kaganate grew stronger, separatist forces increased, undermining central authority. The Khakan became only a militia leader; there was no central army, and each subject Khan had his small army.

The Kimaks and then Khitay pressed the Kipchaks to move west, occupying lands that earlier belonged to Oguzes. After seizing the Oguz lands, the Kipchaks grew considerably stronger, and the Kimaks became their dependents. The Kipchak migration was a planned invasion, a capture of richer pastures. Part of the Kimaks remained in the ancient land along the Irtysh, and a part left with the Kipchaks to the west. A larger portion of the Kimak Kaganate tribes, the Kimaks, Kipchaks, Pechenegs, and the Oguzes migrated to the west, to beyond the Ural, Volga, Don and Dniepr, changing the ethnic map of Eastern Europe. The southern Karluks joined the Karakhanid state.

A significant mass of Kipchaks and Kimaks remained in the Irtysh territories with the ancient Samoyedic peoples. Subsequently, they formed the Siberian Tatars and other Turkic peoples of western Siberia. In the west, the Kipchaks followed the path taken previously by the Pechenegs under pressure of the Oguzes, and later the Oguzes under pressure of the Kimaks and Kipchaks. They crossed the Volga, Don, Dniestr, and Dniepr, and reached the Danube. On their way the Kipchaks were joined by the remains of the Petchenegs and Oguzes. The Rus chronicles under the year 1054 record an appearance near Kyiv of the Oguz people, who were pushed by Kipchaks, a branch of the middle Irtysh and Ob Kimaks.

A court doctor of the Seljuk Sultans, Sharaf al-Zaman al-Marwazi tells that "Kais" and "Kuns" expelled the "Shars" tribe (Middle Turkic sarïğ), and the Shars, in turn, caused the chain displacements and migrations of the Turkmens, then Oghuzes and finally Pechenegs. Matthew of Edessa tells that the "people of snakes" pressed the "red-haired", and the red-haired moved on the Oguzes, who together with the Petchenegs attacked Byzantium. Pletnyova identified the Kais as Kimaks and the Sharys as Kipchaks, whose endonym was calqued by East Slavs as Polovtsy (compare OES polovъje, meaning "light yellow"). Besides the Sharys, i.e., the yellow Kipchaks, other Kimak hordes (Kais, Kuns), and other members of the Kaganate in the advance to the West. However, Golden identified the Qays as the Kumo Xi who were of Proto-Mongolic origins, and Shary as "Yellow Uyghurs", led by Basmyl chiefs, rather than Kipchaks. and "the People of the Snake" should be interpreted as "People of the chieftain named Snake-Dragon" and identified with an anti-Karakhanid tribal coalition (including the Qays among others) led by Budrach, a Yabaku chieftain whose epithet was Böke "Great Dragon / Great Snake", following Klyashtorny.

The Kimak Kaganate's fall in the mid-11th century was caused by external factors. The migration of the Central Asian Mongolic-speaking nomads pushed by the Mongolic Khitay state Lyao formed in Northern China in 916 AD. The Khitay nomads occupied the Kimak and Kipchak lands west of the Irtysh. The Kaganate thereafter declined, and the Kimeks were probably at times subjected to Kyrgyz and Kara-Khitai overlordship. In the 11th–12th centuries the Mongolic-speaking Naiman tribe, in its westward move, displaced the Kimaks-Kipchaks from the Mongolian Altai and Upper Irtysh. From the middle of the 12th century, the Mongolic tribes predominated almost in all the territory of modern Mongolia.

In the 12th century, the territory of the khanate included the southern Urals, the eastern Volga area, the Mangyshlak Peninsula, and the region northwest of the Aral Sea. Their centers included Kimäk and Sangir. Most of the population was semi-nomadic, a minority were sedentary farmers, and many of the city dwellers were craftsmen. In the northern parts of the Kimek territory were underground towns of tunnel networks and chambers to escape the cold.

In the 13th century, the remnant of the Kimak Khanate was conquered by the Mongols and its lands were assigned to the Ulus of Jochi. See Golden Horde for the area's subsequent history. A significant part of the population in the Kipchak Khanate state, created by the Mongols, was from the Kimak Kaganate lands. The Kimak leader Bachman Khan resisted for some years after the Mongols conquered the region.

== Economy ==
With their settlements and pastures stretching for thousands of kilometers from the Irtysh to the Caspian Sea and from the taiga to the Kazakhstan semi-deserts, the economy of the Kimak confederation varied between the eastern areas and the western areas, and between the northern forest-steppe and the southern foothills of the Tian-Shan mountains. The Persian Anonym emphasized that Kipchaks living in the extreme western areas of the Kaganate led a more primitive way of life than those who lived near the Irtysh, where the city Imak was the center of the Kimak union and summer seat of the Kimak Kagan.

The Kimak economy was classic Central Asian pastoral nomadism, with the Turkic pattern of widely varying local economic specializations and adaptations. The key animal was the horse and the main subsistence animal was sheep. As a subsistence animal, fatty-tailed sheep provided meat for food, oil for cooking, and tallow for light. The poorest Kimaks herded cattle. They wintered in the steppe between the Emba and the Ural rivers, but summered near the Irtysh. The summer home of the Kimak Khakans was in the town of Imak, in the middle Irtysh, the winter capital was Tamim on the southern shore of lake Balkhash. Archeology confirms that te Kimaks in the Irtysh area were semi-settled, Al-Idrisi in the 12th century wrote about Kimak cultivated lands as a well-known fact, with wheat crops, millet, barley, legumes, and even rice. The Kimaks also raised grapes and were beekeepers. They left remains of irrigation systems and ruins of castles. Al-Idrisi describes in detail the Kimak cities, emphasizing that all of them were well fortified. In Kagan's city, with its concentration of Kimak aristocracy, were markets and temples. Sedentary life led to the construction of more stable dwellings in the settlements and cities. Clay-walled semi-dugouts were widely used alongside felt yurts. Typically, both types of dwellings had a hearth in the center.

The Kipchaks of both written sources and archeological evidence combined pastoral cattle breeding with some elements of sedentary life. The "Desht-i-Kipchak" or Kiptchak steppes were well organized for prosperous nomadic cattle breeding. The steppe was subdivided into locations with certain pasture routes, yaylak summer settlements, and kishlak winter settlements. Near permanent yaylak and kishlak settlements were kurgan cemeteries. In the settlements and along the steppe shlyakhs ("roads") and coaching routes, Kipchaks erected ancestor sanctuaries with stone statues representing the deceased. The favorite animal was the horse, used for riding and draught in agriculture, and horse meat was considered the best. Among the crafts were leather processing, felt manufacturing, clothing and footwear, and horse harnesses of leather and felt. The Kimaks and other tribes of the Kaganate produced weapons, implements, and agricultural tools. In the forest-steppe areas, woodworking was widespread. Utensils, yurt parts, etc., were made of wood. Iron, gold, and silver were mined and processed. Kimak cities were mostly located along the trading routes. Trade was mostly barter; farmers exchanged grain and flour for lambs and leather, but monetary trade was active as well.

Under the influence of trading relations with Muslim Arabs, the Kimak Kaganate was drawn into the slave-trading business. "Objectionable people" and even relatives were sold into slavery. Slavery became the fate of multitudes, sold by Khitay running endless manhunt attacks and roundups. This tragedy lasted for 200 years, c. 850 – 1050.

== Culture ==
The Kimak were literate in the Old Turkic script. Abu Dulaf (c. 940) and Ibn al-Fakikh wrote about the Kimak Kaganate: "They have reeds with which they write". Archeologists found 10th to 11th century bronze mirrors with inscriptions near Urdjar in the Tarbagatai mountains and in the Irtysh region. L. Kimball stipulates that literate Kimak had works of law, religion, history, and epic poetry, none of which have survived. Although the Kimak had copper coins, most trade was done by barter.

Hunting was a key part of Kimak's life. Large group hunts served as training for war. Pride, prestige, and leadership were associated with the use of falcons, hawks, golden eagles, and hunting dogs, and with the pursuit of beasts of prey, including the now extinct Caspian tiger and the snow leopard.

Kimak Khans wore golden crowns and clothes sewn with gold. Al Idrisi relayed that the Kimaks extract gold with mercury and float it in dung.

Kimak towns were a symbiosis of local predominantly Turkic Kimak populations, pre-existing autochthonous culture, and people from elsewhere in Central Asia. A characteristic feature was that all towns were well-fortified, and in each a prince-chieftain headed a garrison. Towns were situated on lake shores, river banks, in border areas, and in impregnable mountain areas. A fortified wall with an iron gate surrounded the largest capital town Tamim of the Khakan, where also lived aristocrats. In the hills stood castle-forts surrounded by moats.

Kimaks of the Seihun steppe traded in sheep. Kimak's presence on the Volga enabled them to use local major trade routes and put them in contact with the Byzantine and Viking worlds.

Kimaks made cheese and beverages from fermented mare's milk, some of which were probably distilled to high potency, and beverages from rice, millet, barley, and honey.

== Religion ==
The Kimak religion was the same as that of the majority of Turks. In the steppes from the Baikal to the Danube, the Turks believed in Tengri. The western neighbors of the Kyrgyz (Kimaks, Kipchaks, Cumans, Oguzes, Pechenegs, Karluks, etc.), who were located closer to the Muslim lands, still professed Tengrianism in the 9th century. The Kimaks had a tradition of ancestor reverence. On the border with the Uyghurs, Kimaks adopted Manichaeism. The Kimaks also worshipped rocks with images (apparently ancient petroglyphs) and images of human feet. Al-Idrisi spoke about belief in various spirits, and about acceptance by some Kimaks of Manichaeism and Islam. Apparently, the last two religions started penetrating the Kimaks in the 10th century but became widely accepted much later, and then only in the central Irtysh and Balkhash areas.

=== Sanctuaries and Burial customs ===
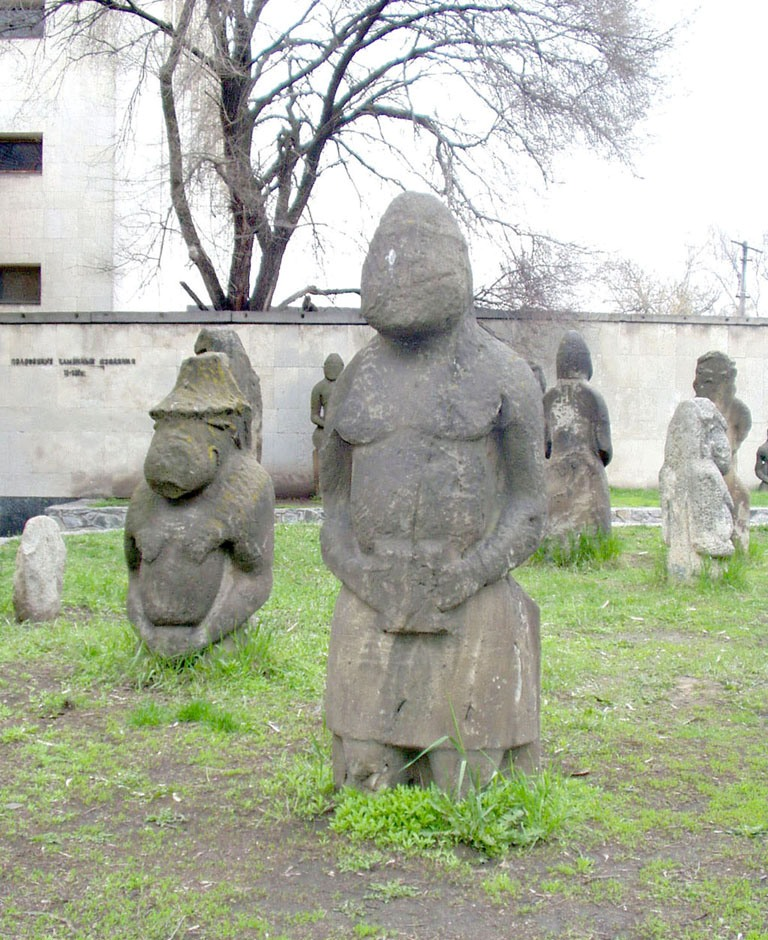
Kipchak "balbal" in Dnipro

The most typical and notable feature of Kimak-Kipchak and Cuman culture are the kurgan stelae or balbals, erected at sanctuaries with square fencing of rough stone and gravel. In the 6th through 9th centuries, similar sanctuaries with statues of deceased ancestors were built by the Göktürks and Uyghurs. After the destruction of the Göktürk and Uyghur Kaganates, the Kipchaks and Cumans were one of the few Turkic peoples who preserved this tradition. Cumans and Kipchaks continued the tradition until the loss of their political independence.

From the end of the 9th century, the construction of small fenced sanctuaries devoted to ancestors, with a statue (or statues) inside, became a distinctive feature of the Cumans and Kipchaks. The obelisks were often simple, rough stelae, frequently with figures without details. Faces were indicated by deeply carved lines, frequently heart-shaped. Female statues differed from men's by having round breasts. The sanctuaries were built only for rich and noble nomads.

Nizami described Kimak's reverence for their ancestors. Kimaks and Cumans/Kipchaks erected many statues, believed to have special power and honored accordingly: "All Cumans/Kipchak tribes, when they happen to pass there, bow down twice in front of this obelisk. Mounted or on foot, they bow to it as to a Creator. A horseman takes an arrow from his quiver in honor of it, shepherds with flocks leave a sheep behind".

Some Kimaks cremated their dead: near the Irtysh, cremation burials have been found.

S. A. Pletneva developed a comparative description of Middle Age N. Pontic burial customs, including Kimaks, Cumans and Kipchaks. The grave gifts are those necessary for a nomad during a trip to the next world: horse harnesses, weapons, less frequently personal decorations and vessels with ritual food. Next to the diseased was laid his true comrade (‘tovarich’), a horse. The belief in the need to supply the diseased with the things necessary on the road and at least for initial life in the other world is described by the 10th-century traveller and writer Ibn Fadlan, describing not a Kimak-Kipchak but an Oguz funeral ceremony. However, from nomadic kurgan excavations we know that the funeral ceremonies of the Turkic peoples was generally similar, meaning the general provisions for the construction of funeral complexes were identical.

And if a person from their number would die, for him is dug a big hole in a shape of a house, he would be dressed in his jacket, his belt, his bow... and would put in his hand a wooden cup with nabiz, would put before him a wooden vessel with nabiz, would bring everything that he has, and would lay it with him in that house... Then would place him in it and cover the house above him with decking, and pile above it something like a dome of clay. Then they would take horses, and depending on their number would kill a hundred of them, or two hundred, or one, and would eat their meat, except for the head, legs, hide, and tail. And, truly, they stretch all this on wooden frames and say: "These are his horses on whom he would go to paradise". And if he ever killed men and was brave, they would carve images from wood, numbering those whom he killed, would place them on his tomb and would say: "These are his youngsters who would serve him in paradise".

— Ibn Fadlan

The nomads were always accompanied into the other world by slaughtered horses, and sometimes by others animals, and enemies killed by him represented by simple stelae or rough human images of stone or wood. The horses were necessary for speedy crossing, for coaching from one world to another; the more of them the better. Among the Oguzes, the images of the deceased were neither installed over the tombs nor in special sanctuaries. That custom was only among the population of the Kimak Kaganate, and mainly among the Kipchaks.

=== Khan-Priests ===
Turkic khans, including the Kimak Khan, had a special role as High Priest and bearer of prophecy. Shabib al-Karani left a probably distorted description of such a ritual:

The Khakan of the Turks has a specific day when they light a huge bonfire. Khakan speaks an oracular phrase into the fire. Then he looks intently staring into the fire and turns away from the fire. If his face becomes yellow, it is a sign of fertility and good; if it becomes white, harvest will fail; if it becomes green means illness and epidemics, and if it becomes black, it indicates the death of the Khakan or a distant journey. When the latter happens, Khakan hastens to go on a journey or a raid. Kimak shamans had yada, "rain stones", which were used to bring rain when it was needed.

—

== Tribal composition ==
=== Gardizi list ===
According to Gardizi (d. 1061), the Kimek confederation included the seven tribes of:

1. Imur / Imi;
2. Kimaks;
3. Tatar;
4. Bayundur / Bayandur;
5. Kïpčak;
6. Nilkar / Lanikaz / Nilqaz;
7. Ajlad.

=== Hudud list ===
10th century Hudud al-'Alam mentions the "country of Kīmāk", ruled by a khagan (king) who has eleven lieutenants that hold hereditary fiefs. This suggests that there were 11 divisions.

== List of known rulers ==
- Abar Khan
- Alip/Alp Derek
- Alip/Alp Qara Uran
- Inalchiq

== See also ==
- Turkic peoples
- Timeline of Turks (500-1300)
- Kimek tribe
- History of Russia
- History of Kazakhstan
- History of the central steppe
- "Kimäk Khanate". Tatar Encyclopaedia (in Tatar). Kazan: The Republic of Tatarstan Academy of Sciences. Institution of the Tatar Encyclopaedia. 2002.

== Bibliography ==
- Ahinjanov S.M. "Kipchaks in history of medieval Kazakhstan", Alma-Ata, 1989, ISBN 5-628-00146-5.
- Agajanov, S. G. (1992). "The States of the Oghuz, the Kimek and the Kipchak". History of Civilizations of Central Asia, Volume IV - The Age of Achievement AD 750 to the End of the Fifteenth Century. Motilal Banarsidass. pp. 61–76. ISBN 978-81-208-1595-7.
- Faizrakhmanov G., "Ancient Turks in Sibiria and Central Asia" Kazan, 'Master Lain', 2000, ISBN 5-93139-069-3.
- Gumilev L.N., "Ancient Turks", Moscow, "Science", 1967.
- Kimball, Linda Amy (1994). "The Vanished Kimak Empire". In Kaplan, Edward H.; Whisenhunt, Donald W. (eds.). Opuscula Altaica: Essays Presented in Honor of Henry Schwarz. Western Washington. ISBN 978-0-914584-19-3.
- Kumenkov B. E., "Kimak State of the 9–11th centuries according to Arabic sources", Alma-Ata, "Science", 1972.
- Pletneva S.A., "Kipchaks", Moscow, 1990, ISBN 5-02-009542-7.
