= Tatar confederation =

Major tribal confederation in the Mongolian Plateau (12th century)

Tatar Nine Tatars 𐱃𐱃𐰺 (Old Turkic) ᠲᠠᠲᠠᠷ ᠬᠠᠨᠯᠢᠭ Tatar Khanlig (Mongol)
- 8th century–1202
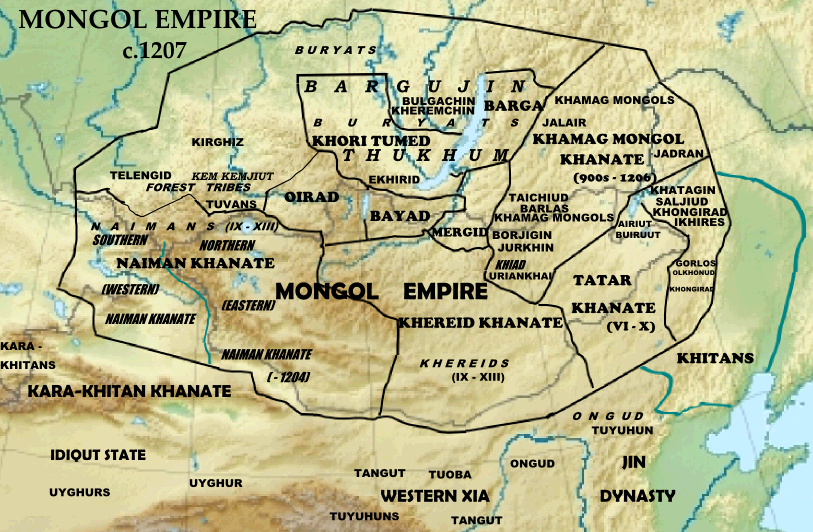
- Tatar and their neighbours in the 13th century
- Status: Nomadic confederation
- Common languages: Mongolic, Turkic (Note: Köprülü proposes that the Tatars whom Kashgari located west of the Kyrgyz and east of the Yabaku were Turkified Mongols. These Tatars were not the same as the Tatar confederation in Mongolia and might have been the constituent Tatar tribe of the Kimak-Kipchak confederation.)
- Religion: Tengrism
- Government: Elective monarchy
- Chieftain
- Legislature: Kurultai
- Historical era: High Middle Ages
  - Established: 8th century
  - Disestablished: 1202
Succeeded by
Khamag Mongol
- Today part of: Mongolia; China

The Tatar confederation (Chinese: 塔塔兒; (Note: Alternatively known in Chinese sources as 達打, 達靼, 達達, 達怛, 達旦, 塔壇, 塔壇, 韃靼, 大檀, 檀檀.) Old Turkic: 𐱃𐱃𐰺, romanized: tatar; (Mongolian: ᠲᠠᠲᠠᠷ; Татар) was one of the five major tribal confederations (khanlig) in the Mongolian Plateau in the 12th century.

== Name and origin ==
The name "Tatar" was possibly first transliterated in the Book of Song as 大檀 Dàtán (MC: *da^{H}-dan) and 檀檀 Tántán (MC: *dan-dan) which the book's compilers stated to be other names of the Rourans; Book of Song and Book of Liang connected Rourans to the earlier Xiongnu while the Book of Wei traced the Rouran's origins back to the Donghu, who were of Proto-Mongolic origin.

Xu proposed that "the main body of the Rouran were of Xiongnu origin" and Rourans' descendants, namely Da Shiwei (aka Tatars), contained Turkic-speaking Xiongnu elements to a great extent. Even so, the language of the Xiongnu is still unknown, and Chinese historians routinely ascribed Xiongnu origins to various nomadic groups, yet such ascriptions do not necessarily indicate the subjects' exact origins: for examples, Xiongnu ancestry was ascribed to Turkic-speaking Göktürks and Tiele as well as Para-Mongolic-speaking Kumo Xi and Khitans.

The first precise transcription of the Tatar ethnonym was written in Turkic on the Orkhon inscriptions, specifically, the Kul Tigin (CE 732) and Bilge Khagan (CE 735) monuments as 𐰆𐱃𐰔⁚𐱃𐱃𐰺⁚𐰉𐰆𐰑𐰣, Otuz Tatar Bodun, 'Thirty Tatar clan' and 𐱃𐰸𐰔⁚𐱃𐱃𐰺, Tuquz Tatar, 'Nine Tatar' referring to the Tatar confederation.

In historiography, the Proto-Mongolic Shiwei tribes are associated with the Dada or identified with specifically the Thirty Tatars. As for the Nine Tatars, Ochir (2016) considers them to be Mongolic and proposes that this tribe apparently formed in Mongolia during the 6th–8th centuries, that their ethnogenesis involved Mongolic people as well as Mongolized Turks who had ruled them; later on, Nine Tatars participated in the ethno-cultural development of the Mongols. Rashid al-Din Hamadani named nine tribes: Tutukliud (Tutagud), Alchi, Kuyn, Birkuy, Terat, Tamashi, Niuchi, Buyragud, and Ayragud, living in the eastern steppe and the Khalkhyn Gol's basin during the second half of the 12th century. Golden (1992) proposes that that Otuz "thirty" denoted thirty clans and Toquz "nine" possibly denoted nine tribes of the Tatar confederation.

Tatars were proposed to dwell in Northeastern Mongolia and around Lake Baikal, or between Manchuria and Lake Baikal.

== Ethnic and linguistic affiliations ==
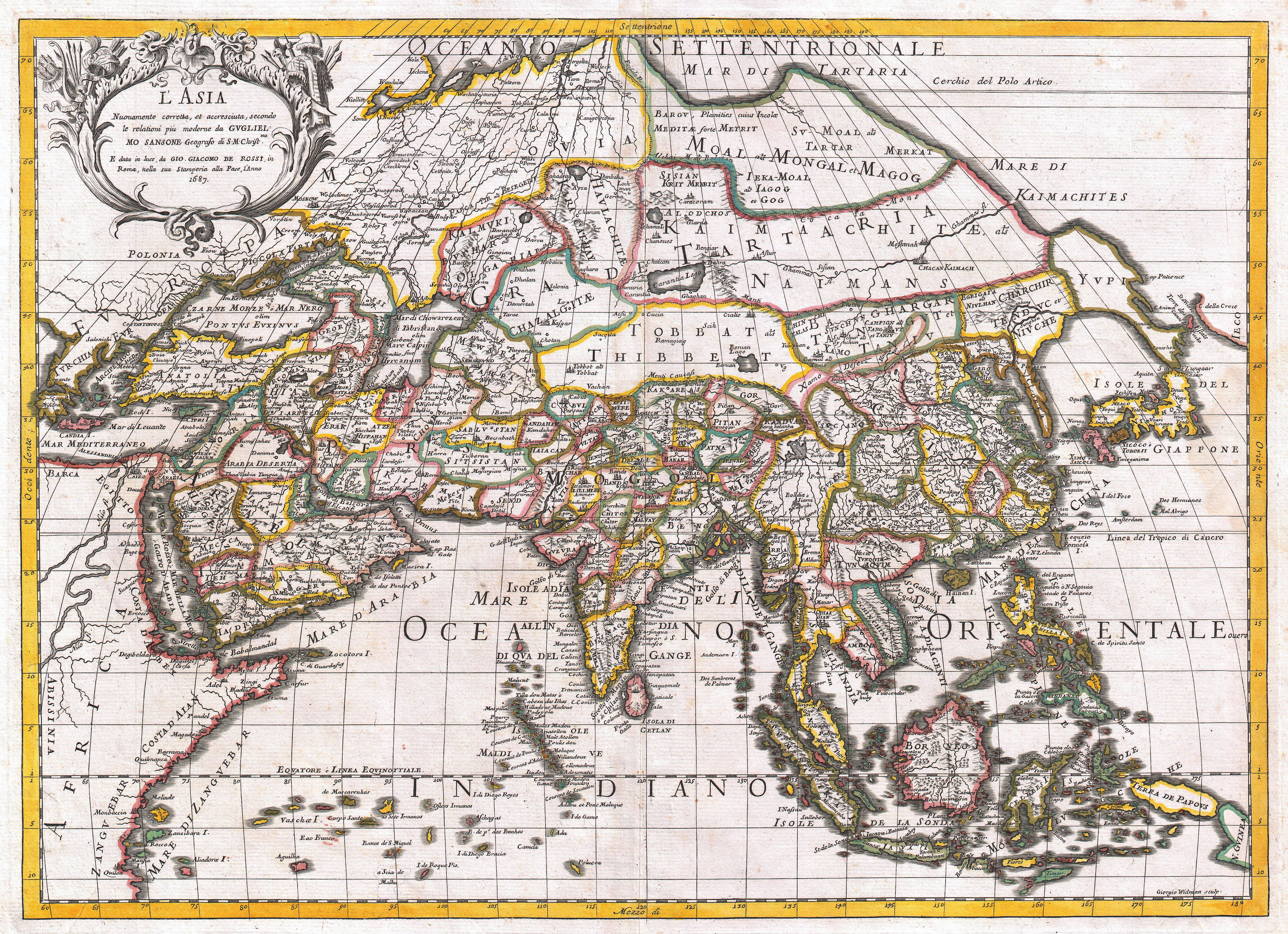
Tatars (Su-Moal, Tartar) on Giovanni Giacomo De Rossi's map. 1687.

Toquz-Tatars and Otuz-Tatars from the Orkhon inscriptions are proposed to be Mongolic speakers (e.g. by sinologists Paul Pelliot, and Ulrich Theobald, turkologist Peter Benjamin Golden, Altaist Volker Rybatzki, etc.). On the other hand, they were proposed to be Turkic speakers (e.g. by Encyclopedia Britannica or Kyzlasov apud Sadur 2012). Additionally, Encyclopedia Britannica proposes that Tatars were possibly related to the Cumans and Kipchaks.

Ochir (2016) proposes that Mongolic and Mongolized Turkic peoples participated in the ethnogenesis of the Nine Tatars, whom Ochir considers to be Mongolic.

Soviet and Russian orientalist Leonid Kyzlasov argues that the Toquz Tatars and Otuz Tatars were instead Turkic-speaking, as the Persian-authored 10th century geographical treatise Hudud al-Alam stated that Tatars were part of the Toghuzghuz, whom Minorsky identified with the Qocho kingdom in eastern Tianshan, founded by Uyghur refugees following the collapse of the Uyghur Khaganate, whose founders belonged to the Toquz Oghuz confederation. (Note: in Sadur (2012:250), the Toquz Oghuz/Qocho Uyghurs were misidentified with the Oghuz Turks who founded, in the late 8th cenrtury, a nomadic state spanning from the Syr Darya's lower reaches to the Caspian Sea; even though the Toghuzghuz country's locations, given by the Hudud, are identifiable with Qocho kingdom's locations: e.g. Chīnānjikath with Gaochang, Ṭafqān with Eastern Tianshan, Panjīkath with Besh Balïq, etc.) At the same time, Kyzlasov is against the identification of the Tatars of the Orkhon inscriptions with Dada from Chinese sources. However, Ochir thinks that the Datan ~ Dadan ~ Dada in Chinese sources since the 9th century indeed denoted Tatars, whom the Gōktürks had mentioned on the Orkhon inscriptions as Otuz-Tatar and Toquz-Tatar and whom Chinese had called Rourans.

Writing in the 11th century, Kara-Khanid scholar Mahmud al-Kashgari included Tatars among the Turkic peoples. (Note: Golden (2015) notes that Kashgari "appears to waver in his usage, often employing Turk to denote his only Qarakhanids, i.e. Türks and at other times to encompass Turkic-speakers in general") He located the Tatars west of the Kyrgyz.

The Turks are, in origin, twenty tribes. They all trace back to Turk, son of Japheth, son of Noah, God’s blessings be upon them – they correspond to the children of Rūm, son of Esau, son of Isaac, son of Abraham, God's blessings be upon them.

[In the following list] I outline the geographical position of each of their tribes in the eastern world. They are listed in order [from West] to East, both pagan and Muslim, beginning with those closest to Rūm. First is: Bajanak, then: Qifja'q, then: Uguz, then: Yam'k, then: Bashgirt, then: Yasmil, then: Qa'y, then: Yaba'quw, then: Tata'r, then: Qirqiz. The last one is closest to Sin. All of these tribes are opposite Rum, extending toward the East ...

When listing the 20 Turkic tribes, Kashgari also included non-Turks such as Kumo Xi, Khitans, Tanguts, and Chinese (the last one rendered as Arabic: Tawġāj < Karakhanid *Tawğaç). In the extant manuscript's text, the Tatars are located west of the Kyrgyz; however, the manuscript's world-map shows that the Tatars were located west of the Ili river and west of the Bashkirs, whom Kashagari already located west of Tatars. Claus Schönig attributed such contradictions to errors made when the text and the map were copied. Kashgari additionally noted that Tatars were bilingual, speaking Turkic alongside their own languages; the same for the Yabaqus, Basmïls, and Chömüls. Yet available evidence suggested that the Yabaqus, Basmïls, and Chömüls were all Turkic speakers; therefore, Mehmet Fuat Köprülü concludes that in the 11th century, the Yabaqus, Basmïls, Chömüls, Qays and Tatars – the last two of whom Köprülü considers to be Turkified Mongols – could speak Kashgari's Karakhanid dialect as well as their own Turkic dialects, yet those peoples' own dialects differed from Karakhanid so substantially that Kashgari considered them other languages. (Note: Golden (2006:42) proposes that Basmïls were Oghurs who remained east after their cousins' westwards migration, and in the 11th century, Basmïls were still speaking an Oghur Turkic language.)

According to Klyashtorny, the name "Tatar" was the Turkic designation for Mongols. As Ushnitsky writes, the ethnonym "Tatar" was used by the Turks only to designate "strangers", that is, peoples who did not speak Turkic languages. The Turkic tribes living among their Mongol-speaking neighbors were also called "tat" or "tat-ar". According to Bartold, the peoples of Mongolian origin who spoke the Mongolian language had always called themselves Tatars. Subsequently, this word was completely supplanted by the word "Mongol".

== History ==
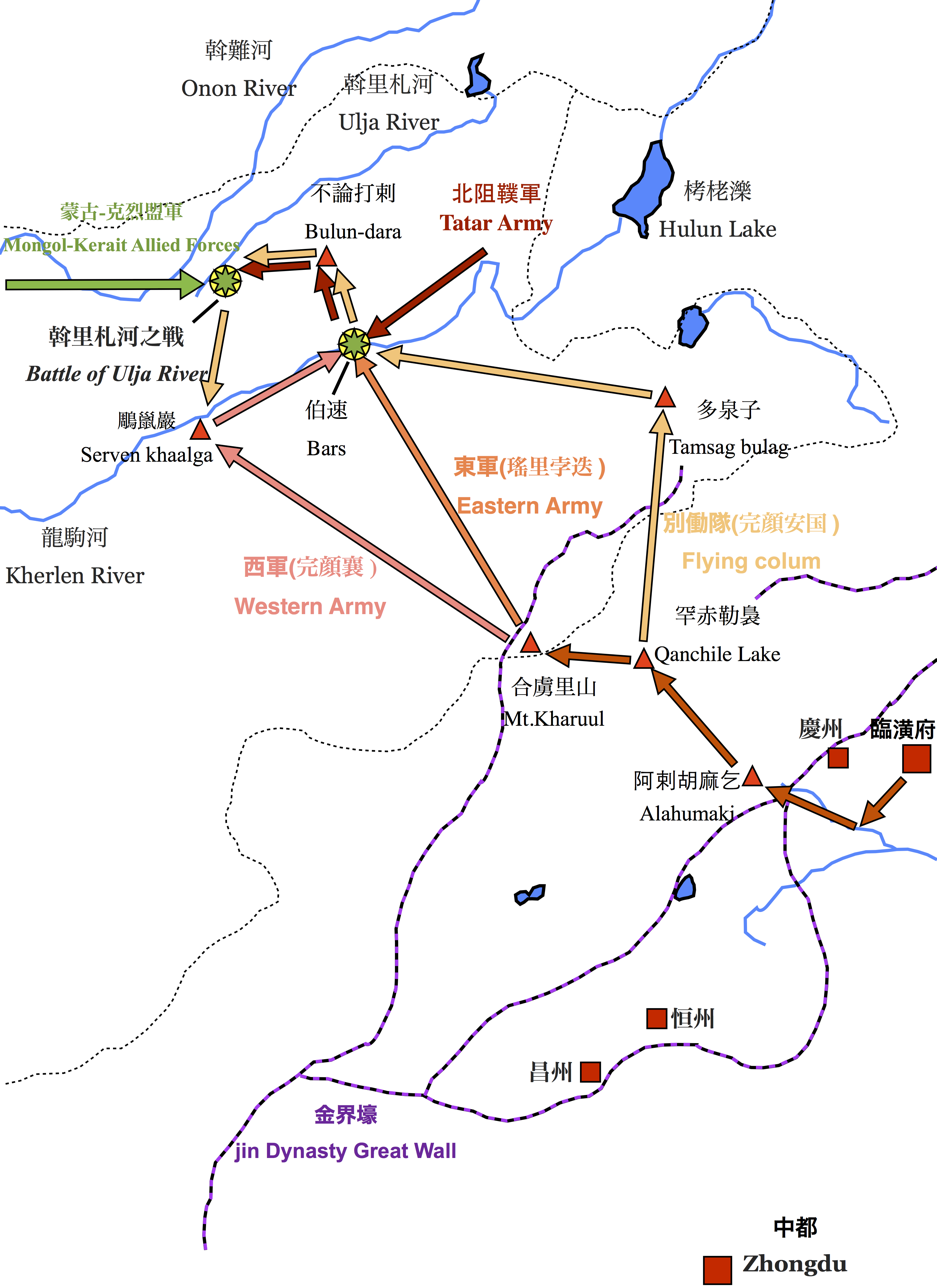
Mongol victory over the Tatars, 1196

The Rourans, Tatars' putative ancestors, roamed modern-day Mongolia in summer and crossed the Gobi Desert southwards in winter in search of pastures. Rourans founded their Khaganate in the 5th century, around 402 CE. Among the Rourans' subjects were the Ashina tribe, who overthrew their Rouran overlords in 552 and annihilated the Rourans in 555. One branch of the dispersed Rourans migrated to the Greater Khingan mountain range where they renamed themselves after Tantan, a historical Khagan, and gradually incorporated themselves into the Shiwei tribal complex and emerged as 大室韋 Da (Great) Shiwei.

The Otuken region, constantly mentioned in the Orkhon inscriptions as the place of residence of the Turks, according to Mahmud Kashgar, was once in the country of the Tatars. According to Vasily Bartold, this message suggests that the Mongols already then reached the west to the area where their neighbors from different sides were Turkic tribes.

Persian historian Gardizi listed Tatars as one of seven founding tribes of the Turkic Kimek confederation. The Shine Usu inscription mentioned that the Toquz Tatars, in alliance with the Sekiz-Oghuz, (Note: "Eight Oghuzes", an ethnonym which denotes the eight tribes who had revolted against the leading Uyghur tribe, according to Czeglédy.) unsuccessfully revolted against Uyghur Khagan Bayanchur, who was consolidating power between 744 and 750 CE. After being defeated three times, half of the Oghuz-Tatar rebels rejoined the Uyghurs, while the other half fled to an unknown people, who were identified as Khitans or Karluks. According to Senga and Klyashtorny, part of the Toquz-Tatar rebels fled westwards from the Uyghurs to the Irtysh river basin, where they later organized the Kipchaks and other tribal groupings (either already there or also newly arrived) into the Kimek tribal union. According to the Russian orientalist Vasily Ushnitsky, reports of medieval Muslim sources about the Tatar origin of the Kimak dynastic clan are the argument of the supporters of the Mongolian origin of the Kimaks and Kipchaks. The news about the Tatars, from whom the Kimaks separated, according to Josef Markwart, confirms the fact of the movement to the west of the Turkified Mongolian elements.

As for the division of Tatars who remained east, by the 10th century, they became subjects of the Khitan-led Liao dynasty. After the fall of the Liao, the Tatars experienced pressure from the Jurchen-led Jin dynasty and were urged to fight against the other Mongol tribes. The Tatars lived on the fertile pastures around Hulun Nuur and Buir Nuur and occupied a trade route to China proper in the 12th century. From the 10th to 13th centuries, Shatuo Turks joined Tatar confederation in the territory of the modern Mongolia, and became known as Ongud or White Tatars branch of the Tatars. Southern Song ambassador Zhao Hong wrote in 1221 that in Genghis Khan's Mongol Empire, there were three divisions based on their distance from the Jurchen Jin-ruled China: the White Tatars (白韃靼 Bai Dada), the Black Tatars (黑韃靼 Hei Dada), and the Wild Tatars (生韃靼 Sheng Dada), who were identified, by Kyzlasov, with the Turkic-speakers - including the Öngüds (of Turkic Shatuo origin), Mongolic speakers -to whom belonged Genghis Khan and his companions-, and the Tungusic speakers, (Note: Xin Wudaishi also mentioned the Tungusic Mohe background of Tatars in Yin Mountains.) respectively.

The Secret History of the Mongols claimed that the Tatars were mortal enemies of the Mongols: they betrayed Khamag Mongol's khan Ambaghai to be executed by the Jurchen Jin dynasty and also treacherously poisoned chief Yesukhei, father of Genghis Khan; (Note: Whose birth-name Temüjin was reportedly based on that of captured Tatar chief Temüjin-üge.) consequently, in 1202, Genghis Khan allied with Ong Khan, conquered the Tatars, and had Tatar men taller than a linchpin executed, and spared only women (Note: Genghis himself took Tatar sisters Yesui and Yesugen as wives.) and children. The surviving Tatars were absorbed into Genghis Khan's tribe, and the Tatar confederation ceased to exist. Since the Tatars were a tribe of thousands, their absorption greatly enlarged Genghis Khan's tribe.

== Tatars and Mongols ==
Mongolian historian Urgunge Onon proposes that Mongols were initially known to Europeans as Tatars because Tatars were compelled to fight as vanguards (Note: The most vulnerable position for tribes associated with nomadic confederations, another example being the Kabar vanguard associated with the Magyars' confederation.) before the main body of Mongol cavalry and the ethnonym Tatars would then be transferred to all Mongols.

However, Bartold, Ushnitsky, Klyashtorny, Theobald, and Pow notice that even ethnic Mongols were often called Tatars, especially in unofficial sources (Note: Pow lists four official sources: the Secret History of the Mongols, Rashid al-Din’s Compendium of Chronicles, History of Yuan, and Shengwu qinzheng lu, all produced by historians employed by or influenced by the Toluid courts of Yuan China and the Ilkhanate; on the other hand, Pow defines unofficial sources as those "not controlled and formed by Mongol Toluid courts".) either authored by foreigners (e.g. Turks, Chinese, Vietnamese, Jurchens, Javanese) or by ethnic Mongols themselves (e.g. general Muqali or even Khan Ögedei). Pow proposes that the Mongolic-speaking tribes used the endonym Tatar during the first 30 to 40 years of the Mongol Empire's expansion, before self-identifying as Mongols, originally a dynastic-state label taken after the 12th-century Great Mongol State (大蒙古國); meanwhile, the old endonym Tatar fell out of favor and would be used to as a derogatory term for rebellious Mongolic-speaking tribes; (Note: For example, the Water Mongols (Zumoals, Su-Moghol, Usu Irgen), who also called themselves Tatars and were known as Water Tatars (水達達).) Pow further speculates that the name-change was motivated by insecurities: either because the enemies held in contempt the name Tatar, or because the subjects used the endonym Tatar for Mongolic-speaking elites, or because rivalries among Genghis Khan's descendants necessitated the delineation of "in" and "out" groups.

== Legacy ==
The Turkic-speaking ancestors of today’s Volga Tatars adopted the endonym of their Mongol conquerors as a sign of political allegiance, before ultimately subsuming the latter culturally and linguistically.
