= Tatars (Kimak) =

Medieval Turkic tribe of the Kimak confederation

The Tatar were one of the seven original Turkic tribes that made up the Kimak confederation, along with the Imur, Kimaks, Bayandur, Kipchak, Lanikaz and Ajlad. The Tatār were the third in order. The Kimak tribes originated in the Central Asian steppes, and had migrated to the territory of present-day Kazakhstan. The Tatar, as part of the Kimak, were mentioned by Gardizi (d. 1061).

According to R. Fakhroutdinov, these Tatars 'were a branch of the ancient Tatar population that went to the west after the collapse of the Eastern Turkic kaganate'. Mahmud al-Kashgari noted that the Tatars are bilingual, speaking in Turkic alongside their own language. Golden proposed that Tatars were Turkified Mongolic speakers.

Mahmut Kashgari, an 11th-century historian, lists the Tatārs as one of ten prominent Turkic tribes and enumerates the locations of the Turkic polities from the borders of the Eastern Roman Empire to the borders of China in the following sequence:

1. Bäčänäk;
2. Qifčāk;
3. Oğuz;
4. Yemēk;
5. Bašğirt;
6. Basmyl;
7. Qāi;
8. Yabāqu;
9. Tatār;
10. Qirqiz.

Kashgari also noted that "Among the nomadic peoples are the Čömül - they have a gibberish (raṭāna [رَطَانَة]) of their own, but also know Turkic; also Qāy, Yabāqu, Tatār and Basmil - each of these groups has its own language, but they also know Turkic well".

The Shine Usu inscription mentioned that the Toquz Tatars, in alliance with the Sekiz-Oghuz (i.e. "Eight Oghuzes", denoting the eight tribes who revolted against the leading Uyghur tribe), unsuccessfully revolted against Uyghur Khagan Bayanchur, who was consolidating power between 744 and 750 CE. After being defeated three times, half of the Oghuz & Tatar rebels rejoined the Uyghurs, while the other half fled to an unknown people, who were identified as Khitans or Karluks. According to Senga and Klyashtorny, part of the Toquz-Tatar rebels fled westwards from the Uyghurs to the Irtysh river basin, where they later organized the Kipchaks and other tribal groupings (either already there or also newly arrived) into the Kimek tribal union.

== See also ==
- Tatar confederation
- Tatars

== Sources ==
- Agajanov, S. G. (1992). "The States of the Oghuz, the Kimek and the Kipchak". History of Civilizations of Central Asia, Volume IV: The Age of Achievement AD 750 to the End of the Fifteenth Century. Motilal Banarsidass. pp. 61–76. ISBN 978-81-208-1595-7.
- Bosworth, C. E.; Clauson, Gerard (April 1965). "Al-Xwārazmī on the Peoples of Central Asia". The Journal of the Royal Asiatic Society of Great Britain and Ireland (1/2): 4. JSTOR 25202803.
- Fakhroutdinov, Ravil (2004). History of the Tatars. Magarif Publishing House. ISBN 978-5-7761-1250-8.
