= Shiwei people =

Pre-Genghis Khan term for Mongolic peoples

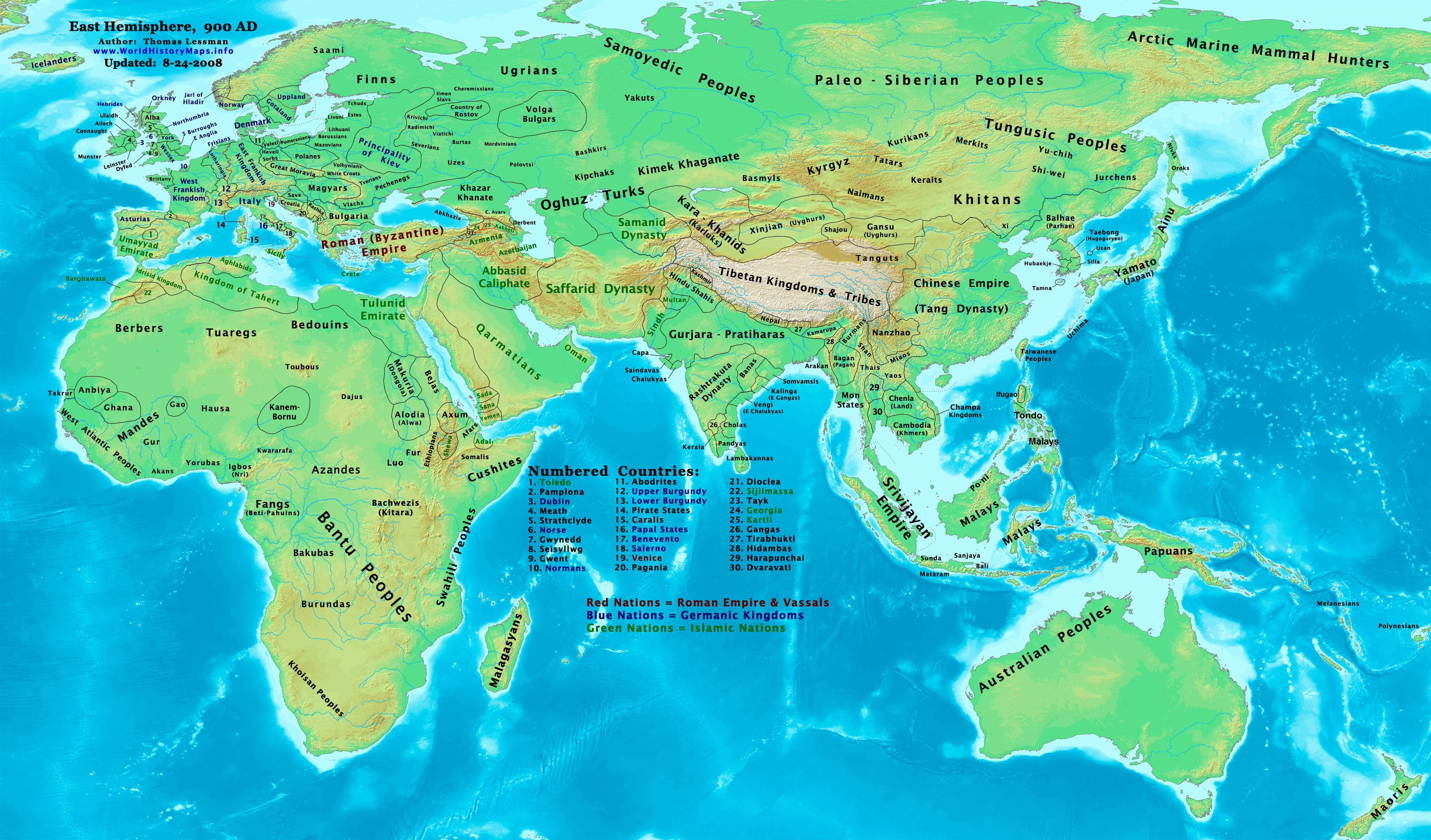
Asia in 900 AD, showing location of the Shiwei and their neighbors.

Shiwei (simplified Chinese: 室韦; traditional Chinese: 室韋; pinyin: Shìwéi; Wade–Giles: Shih^{4}-wei^{2}) were a Mongolic people that inhabited far-eastern Mongolia, northern Inner Mongolia, northern Manchuria and the area near the Okhotsk Sea beach. Records mentioning the Shiwei were recorded from the time of the Northern Wei (386–534) until the rise of the Mongols under Genghis Khan in 1206 when the name "Mongol" and "Tatar" were applied to all the Shiwei tribes.

The Shiwei-Mongols were closely related to the Khitan people to their south. As a result of pressure from the west, south and south-east they never established unified, semi-sedentarized empires like their neighbors, but remained nomadic confederations led by tribal chieftains, alternately submitting to the Turks, the Chinese and the Khitan as the political climate changed. The Mengwu Shiwei, one of the 20 Shiwei tribes during the Tang dynasty (618–907), were also called the Menggu during the Liao dynasty (907–1125) and are generally considered to be the ancestors of the Mongols of Genghis Khan. The modern Korean pronunciation of Mengwu (蒙兀 Měngwù) is Mong-ol (/moŋ.ol/). Mongolia is still called "Menggu" (蒙古 Měnggǔ) in Chinese today.

The names Shiwei, Sibe, Xibe and possibly Xianbei have a common origin.

== Origins ==
The Shiwei were descendants of the Yuwen Xianbei, but also included some tribes of the Tungusic Mohe people. Shiwei is a variant transcription for Xianbei.

Chinese dynastic histories describe the Shiwei as somewhat related to the Khitan, who were of Xianbei origin. They were local Xianbei tribes who became independent after the Xianbei state dissolved in 234 with the death of Budugen. In the Book of Wei, it is claimed that the language of the Shiwei was the same as the Khitan's, who spoke the Khitan language; in the Book of Sui, it is claimed that the Shiwei belonged to the same kind of people as the Khitan; and in both the New Book of Tang and Old Book of Tang, it is claimed that the Shiwei were a collateral branch of the Khitan. It is likely that at least some tribes of the Shiwei had some ethnic similarities with the Khitan. Tang dynasty historian Wan Guowei describes the Shiwei as a Khitan tribe.

The Book of Sui states that the title of the northern Shiwei chieftain was Mohefu, which is the same as the Khitan title for their chieftain – Mohefu (traditional Chinese: 莫賀弗) or "Mofuhe" (traditional Chinese: 莫弗賀), which is the Chinese transliteration of the Iranic/Sogdian title Bagapuhr/βɣpwr, meaning "Son of God". For example, the Khitan Mofuhe Hechen who paid tribute to the Northern Wei at Datong in 466–470 and the Khitan Mofuhe Wuyu who fled from Goguryeo and the Rouran Khaganate in 479.

Concerning the ethnic relationship between the Shiwei and the Khitan, "the ethnonymic distinction between the Shiwei and Khitan suggests that the division had been completed between the branches leading to Proto-Mongolic and Para-Mongolic".

== Tribes ==
The Shiwei and Wuluohou are known as the Shiwei tribes in the period of the Northern Wei dynasty (386–534), but are separately recorded in the Book of Wei. During the period from the Northern Qi (550–577) to the Sui dynasty (581–618), there were five groups of Shiwei, they were the Nan (Southern) Shiwei, Bei (Northern) Shiwei, Da (Great) Shiwei, Bo Shiwei and Shenmoda Shiwei. In the Tang period (618–907), it is known that there were twenty Shiwei tribes, according to the records in dynastic histories. They were the Wusugu, Yisaimo, Saiezhi, Hejie, Wuluohu, Nali, Lingxi, Shanbei, Huangtou (Yellow-head), Da (Great) Ruzhe, Xiao (Lesser) Ruzhe, Powo, Nebeizhi, Luotuo, Dong (Eastern) Shiwei, Xi (Western) Shiwei, Da (Great) Shiwei, Mengwu Shiwei, Luozu Shiwei (Note: Zuev (2002) links the 落俎 Luozu < MC: *lɑk̚-t͡ʃɨʌ^{X} (or 落坦 Luotan < MC: *lɑk̚-tʰɑn^{X}) to one tribe in Kimek–Kipchak confederation; namely, the Lanikaz, whose name Zuev contends to be a distortion of Laktan.) and Dagui.

Wuluohun is said to be another name for the Uriankhai Mongols. The Da Shiwei tribe is thought to be descended from some Rouran who fled east after being defeated by the Turks in 555. They were led by their chieftain Tantan (Tatar) and were incorporated into the Shiwei. In fact, Tatar is held to be an alternative name for some major Shiwei tribes. The Da Shiwei are thought to be the same as the Taichiud Mongol tribe. According to the Stele of Kul Tigin the Thirty Tatars and Nine Tatars were formidable eastern rivals of the Göktürks along with the Khitan. The number of Tatar tribes are roughly equal to the number of Shiwei tribes. Although linguistically Mongolic, the Da Shiwei may have been descended in some part from the Dingling. The Heichezi ("black-cart") was a Shiwei clan famous for their cart industry. According to the Liaoshi, at one time the Khitan learnt the art of cart-making from the Heichezi clan. The Huangtou ("yellow head") Shiwei may have been named so because of a high incidence of blondness within their tribe, but it is not certain. However, blondness still occurs regularly in the region today.

== Events ==
In describing the Shiwei tribes, the Tang Huiyao vol. 96 records, "Eastward again, there was the Wuluohu tribe, the other name was Wuluohun, it was called Wuluohou in the Yuan Wei. It inhabited north of the Mount Mogaidu, and beside the Chuo River. This tribe had presented homage and paid tributes continually since the fourth year of Taiwu Zhenjun (444) (of the Northern Wei), throughout the Northern Qi, Zhou and Sui until the years after reign period of Wude (618–626)." According to the Weishu, the history of the Northern Wei dynasty founded by the Tuoba Xianbei, in 443 CE a contingent of horsemen known as the Wuluohou (of the Shiwei) asked for an audience with the Northern Wei emperor Tuoba Dao. They informed him that their people had heard of a cave located in what is now the Elunchun Autonomous Banner in northeastern Inner Mongolia. The local inhabitants worshiped this cave as a Xianbei ancestral shrine, a fact that convinced Tuoba Dao that the legendary cave that gave birth to his people had been located. The Weishu goes on to say that the emperor sent an emissary, Li Chang, to investigate the report. Li Chang verified the story, and held various ceremonies to worship the Xianbei ancestors, and left an inscription describing the ceremonies. The cave, known today as Gaxian cave site, and the inscription were discovered in 1980 by archaeologists. This find and other historical and archaeological evidence has helped to verify that the Tuoba Xianbei probably emigrated south from this area sometime in the early first century CE. In 544 the Shiwei chieftain Chaniandoufa brought gifts from his homeland to the Tuoba Wei court.

The Shiwei's political fate, as the Khitan in great part of their pre-dynastic period, was largely determined by their far more powerful neighbors and by ever-changing balance of power between the successive regimes ruling northern China, on the one hand, and belligerent tribal neighbors on the other. When China had fallen into an anarchy at the end of the Sui dynasty and the other nomadic people, the Türks, were getting stronger in northern Asia simultaneously, the Shiwei submitted to the Türks, under the control of the three Tutuns sent by the Turkic supreme leader, so did the Khitan who were controlled by the Tutun, Pandie, who was sent by the Turkic Shabolue khaghan. At the beginning of the 7th century, the great Chinese Tang dynasty was established. The Shiwei and many other tribal peoples were gradually drawn into its political orbit. In the period from 618 to 629, the Shiwei frequently presented homage and paid tributes to the Tang court. As a response, the Tang court set Shizhou, which was subordinate to the governor-general of Yingzhou to control the Shiwei and Khitan tribes in 629. Until 632, the Wuluohu and some other Shiwei tribes submitted to the Tang.

According to the historical records, in the fourth year of Zhenyuan (788), the Xi raided the Zhenwu army (located in modern Hohhot) together with the Shiwei, slaughtering both the Chinese and the Uighur commissioners, capturing the frontier people and plundering their domestic animals. The Shiwei as relative weak tribes almost always wavered between the stronger powers. They were involved in the campaign over the Chinese frontier, probably by the coercion of the Xi, their stronger neighbors to the southwest. In 789, the Shiwei sent envoys to the Tang court to apologize for their offence. During the period from 792 to 842, while having been Uighur vassals, the Shiwei still frequently presented tributes to the Tang court. In 835 the Shiwei chieftain Dasheng Duacheng led 30 Shiwei representatives in a visit to the Tang court. The Shiwei chieftain Dale came to visit the Tang court along with the Xi during the reign of Emperor Yizong of Tang (reigned 859–873). After the Uighur Empire was brought to an end by the Kirghiz in 840, they submitted to the Tang and killed the Uighur commissioners by an order of the Tang. From 789 onward, no aggressive actions conducted by the Shiwei could be found throughout the Chinese historical data, until some of their tribes were incorporated into the Khitan and some others migrated to the northwest around the turn of the 10th century.

In 1087 representatives of the subject Menggu Shiwei came to show respect to the Khitan court at Yanjing (Beijing). The Menggu Shiwei aided the Liao dynasty against the Jurchens till the end. According to the Qidan Guozhi, in 1124 the Shiwei helped the Khitans against the invading Jurchens. The Dajin Guozhi recording the same event says that in 1124 the Tatars helped the Khitans against the invading Jurchens. This, among other indications, has led to the opinion that the Tatars were identical with the Shiwei. Bodonchar Munkhag and Khaidu were pre-Genghis Khan chieftains of the Shiwei.
