= Yabaku =

Medieval Turkic tribe

Yabaku is a fairly enigmatic tribe out of ten prominent Türkic tribes enumerated by Mahmut Kashgari (11th century) in the list describing the location of the Türkic polities from the borders of the Eastern Roman Empire to the borders of China in the following sequence:

1. Bäčänäk;
2. Qifčāk;
3. Oğuz;
4. Yemēk;
5. Bašğirt;
6. Basmil;
7. Qāi;
8. Yabāqu;
9. Tatār;
10. Qirqiz.

Yabāqu can be related etymologically to Turkic yapağu, "originally denoting 'matted hair or wool' and then an animal characterized by this, e.g. a 'colt.' Zoonyms or hipponyms are known in Turkic ethnonymy, some of probable totemic origin." Kashgari noted that "Among the nomadic peoples are the Čömül - they have a gibberish (raṭāna [رَطَانَة]) of their own, but also know Turkic; also Qāy, Yabāqu, Tatār and Basmil - each of these groups has its own language, but they also know Turkic well". According to Golden, Turkic Yabâqu/Yapağu was probably translated from, or a Turkic rendition of, an ethnonym of a bilingual people "with a complex ethno-linguistic heritage".

Additionally, Kashgari named Yapâqu suw as a river flowing over Kashgar from mountains in Ferghana; and the Hudud al-Alam also mentioned a *Yabağu river (Note: mistakenly rendered in manuscript as Tbâğr) near Özkend. These facts pointed to Yabakus' presence in Ferghana since at least the 10th century, if not earlier. Kashagari mentioned another river in the Yabaqu steppes - namely, the Yamar river, which Vasily Bartold identified with the Emil.

According to Kashgari, Yabaku chief Böke Budrach led a pagan coalition from Western Siberia or further east across the Irtysh river to wars against Islamic Kara-khanid khanate (comprising modern Western and Eastern Turkestan); Karakhanid heroic epics also mentioned these invasions, which Karakhanids thwarted successfully. According to Al-Utbi and Ali ibn al-Athir, the coalition's invasions began around the 1010s (or later in the 1030s) from the direction of Ṣîn, i.e. Northern China. (Note: Al-Athir included the Khitans among the coalition's participants) However, Budrach's coalition, which outnumbered the Karakhanid army, was still defeated by Toghan Khan (r. 998 - 1017/1018), who died shortly after his victory. Kashgari cited a witness, who related that Ghazi Arslan Tegin defeated the Yabaku-led coalition and captured Budrach.

Golden proposes that the authority of the Yabaqu, as the coalition's leading tribe, extended also to their allies the Basmils and the Qays. Noting that Kashgari glossed Budrach's epithet Böke as "large dragon (ṯu'bān 'aẓim)" - which might also mean "great snake", Golden further identifies Budrach's coalition, as "People of the Chieftain named Snake/Dragon", with the "Snake People" who had driven out the "Pale Ones" (xartêš), causing the "Pale Ones" to dislodge the Oghuz Turks, who in turn expelled the Pechenegs, in the account given by Matthew of Edessa. Golden contends that: if "Snake People" in Matthew's account were to be identified with the Qays in a parallel account by al-Marwazi), then that's because the Qays participated in the coalition led by chief Budrach, nicknamed Böke - Snake/Dragon - "a kind of honorific associated with outstanding warriors"; not because Qay itself meant "snake" in Mongolic. (Note: "Snake" is moɣai in Middle Mongolian and могой mogoi in Khalkha)

== See also ==
- History of Kyrgyzstan
- History of Kazakhstan
- History of China
- History of Russia
- History of Siberia
