= Yemek =

850–1050 AD Turkic-speaking tribe of the Kimak confederation

Location of the Kimak, with contemporary polities circa 800 CE

The Yemek or Kimak were a Turkic tribe constituting the Kimak-Kipchak confederation, whose other six constituent tribes, according to Abu Said Gardizi (d. 1061), were the Imur (or Imi), Tatars, Bayandur, Kipchaks, Lanikaz, and Ajlad.

== Ethnonym ==
Minorsky, citing Marquart, Barthold, Semenov and other sources, proposed that the name Kīmāk (pronounced Kimäk) was derived from Iki-Imäk, "the two Imäk", probably referring to the first two clans (Īmī and Īmāk) of the federation. On the other hand, Pritsak attempted to connect the Kimek with the Proto-Mongolic Kumo of the Kumo Xi confederation (庫莫奚; Middle Chinese: kʰuo^{H}-mɑk̚-ɦei; *qu(o)mâġ-ġay, from *quo "yellowish" plus denominal suffix *-mAk). Peter B. Golden judges Pritsak's reconstruction "highly problematic", as Pritsak did not explain how Quomâġ might have produced Kimek; even so, Golden still considers the connection with the Proto-Mongolic world seriously.

Mahmud al-Kashgari did not mention any Kimak, but Yamāk, and further remarked that Kara-Khanids like him considered Yemeks to be "a tribe of the Kipchaks", though contemporary Kipchaks considered themselves a different party. The ethnonym Yemäk might have been transcribed in the mid 7th century by Chinese authors as 鹽莫 Yánmò < Middle Chinese *jiäm-mâk, referring a Tiele group who initially inhabited northwestern Mongolia before migrating to north of Altay Mountains and Irtysh zone. (Note: 鹽莫 Yánmò, from MC *jiäm-mâk, should not be confused with 燕末 Yànmò, from MC ʔen^{H}-muɑt̚ (ZS) / *ˀien-muât (Zuev). 燕末 Yànmò, the residence of Xueyantuo Khagan Yağmurçin, is identified by Cen Zhongmian with the toponym Ïbar Baş (OTrk 𐰃𐰉𐰺𐱈) mentioned in Tonyukuk inscriptions.)

Initially, Golden (1992:202, 227, 263) has accepted the identification of Kimeks with Imeks/Yimeks/Yemeks, because the /k/ > ∅, resulting in Kimek > İmek, was indeed attested in several Medieval Kipchak dialects; Golden has also thought Yemeks unlikely to be 鹽莫 *jiäm-mâk > Yánmò in Chinese source. However, Golden later changes his mind; he reasons that, as the Medieval Kipchak dialectal sound-change /k/ > ∅ had not yet happened in the mid-7th century Old Turkic, the identification of Yemeks with Kimeks is disputed. As a result, Golden (2002:660-665) later abandons the Kimeks > Yemeks identification and becomes more amenable to the identification of 鹽莫 Yánmò with Yemeks, by scholars such as Hambis, Zuev, and Kumekov, cited in Golden (1992:202).

According to Tishin (2018), Yemeks were simply the most important of the seven constituent tribes whose representatives met at the Irtysh valley, where the diverse Kimek tribal union emerged, as related by Gardizi.

== History ==
In the Western Turkic Khaganate two Chuy tribes, Chumukun and Chuban, occupied a privileged position of being voting members of the confederation's Onoq elite, while the Chuyue and Chumi tribes did not. A part of the Chuyue tribe intermixed with the Göktürks' remnants and formed a tribe called Shatuo, which lived in southern Dzungaria, to the west of Lake Barkol. The Shatuo separated from the Chuyue in the middle of the 7th century. (Another component of the Chuyue, the Chigil, were still listed in censuses taken in Tsarist Russia and the early decades of the Soviet Union.)

After the disintegration in 743 AD of the Western Turkic Kaganate, a part of the Chuy tribes remained in its successor, the Uyghur Kaganate (740-840), and another part retained their independence. During the Uyghur period, the Chuy tribes consolidated into the nucleus of the tribes known as Kimaks in the Arab and Persian sources. Lev Gumilyov associated one Duolu Chuy tribe, Chumukun 處木昆 (< *čomuqun "immersed in water, drowned") with the Kimeks as both coincidentally occupied the same territory, i.e. Semirechye, and that Chumukun were known only to Chinese and Kimek only to Persians and Arabs. The head of the Kimek confederation was titled Shad Tutuq, "Prince Governor" (tutuk being from Middle Chinese tuo-tuok 都督 "military governor"); as well as Yinal Yabghu, according to Gardizi. By the middle of the eighth century, the Kimeks occupied territory between the Ural River and Emba River, and from the Aral Sea and Caspian steppes, to the Zhetysu area.

=== Kimek Khanate ===
After the 840 AD breakup of the Uyghur Khaganate, the Yemeks headed a new political tribal union, creating a new Kimek state. Abu Said Gardizi (d. 1061) wrote that the Kimak federation consisted of seven tribes: Yemeks (Ar. Yamāk < MTrk *Yemǟk or *(Y)imēk), Eymür, Tatars, Bayandur, Kipchak, Lanikaz and Ajlad. Later, an expanded Kimek Kaganate partially controlled the territories of the Oguz, Kangly, and Bagjanak tribes, and in the west bordered the Khazar and Bulgar territories. The Kimaks led a semi-settled life, as the Hudūd mentioned a town named *Yimäkiya (> Yamakkiyya > ms. Namakiyya); while the Kipchaks, in some customs, resembled the contemporary Oghuzes, who were nomadic herders.

In the beginning of the eleventh century the Kipchak Khanlyk moved west, occupying lands that had earlier belonged to the Oguz. After seizing the Oguz lands, the Kipchaks grew considerably stronger, and the Kimeks became dependents of the Kipchaks. The fall of the Kimek Kaganate in the middle of the 11th century was caused by the migration of Central Asian Mongolian-speaking nomads, displaced by the Mongolian-speaking Khitan state of Liao, which formed in 916 AD in Northern China. The Khitan nomads occupied the Kimek and Kipchak lands west of the Irtysh. In the eleventh to twelfth centuries a Mongol-speaking Naiman tribe displaced the Kimeks and Kipchaks from the Mongolian Altai and Upper Irtysh as it moved west.

Between the ninth and thirteenth centuries Kimek tribes were nomadizing in the steppes of the modern Astrakhan Oblast of Russia. A portion of the Kimeks that left the Ob-Irtysh interfluvial region joined the Kipchak confederation that survived until the Mongol invasion, and later united with the Nogai confederation of the Kipchak descendants. The last organized tribes of the Nogai in Russian sources were dispersed with the Russian construction of zaseka bulwarks in the Don and Volga regions in the 17th-18th centuries, which separated the cattle breeding populations from their summer pastures. Another part of the Nogai were deported from the Budjak steppes after Russian conquest of Western Ukraine and Moldova in the eighteenth and early nineteenth century.

== Ethnolinguistic Belonging ==
According to C. E. Bosworth (2007) and R. Turaeva (2015) the Kimek tribe was Turkic.

According to R. Preucel and S. Mrozowki (2010) and S. Divitçioğlu (2010), the Kimek tribe was Tungusic.

Josef Markwart proposed that Kimeks were Turkicized Tatars, who were related to the para-Mongolic-speaking Tatabï, known to Chinese as Kumo Xi.

Sümer associates the Kimeks with the Chiks (who were mentioned in Tang Huiyao and Bilge Qaghan inscription); however, Golden sees little evidence for this.

== Legacy ==
According to Golden (1992), the Quns and Śari (whom Czeglédy (1949:47-48,50) identifies with Yellow Uyghurs) were possibly induced into the Kimek union or took over said union and absorbed the Kimek. As a result, the Kipchaks presumably replaced the Kimeks as the union's dominant group, while the Quns gained ascendancy over the westernmost tribes and became Quman (though difficulties remain with the Qun-Cuman link and how Qun became Cuman, e.g. qun + man "the real Quns"? > *qumman > quman?). Kimeks were still represented amongst the Cuman–Kipchaks as Yimek ~ Yemek (Old East Slavic: Polovtsi Yemiakove).

The majority of researchers (Bakikhanov, S.A. Tokarev, A.I. Tamay, S. Sh. Gadzhieva) derive the Kumyks' name from Kimak, or from another name for Kipchaks — Cuman.

== Genetics ==
A genetic study published in Nature in May 2018 examined the remains of Kimek male buried in Pavlodar Region, Kazakhstan ca. 1350 AD. He was found to be carrying the paternal haplogroup R1b1b and the maternal haplogroup A. It was noted that he was not found to have "elevated East Asian ancestry".

== See also ==
- Kipchak people
- Kipchaks in Georgia
- History of Kyrgyzstan
- History of Kazakhstan
- History of the central steppe
- History of Mongolia
- History of China

== Sources ==
- Agajanov, S. G. (1992). "The States of the Oghuz, the Kimek and the Kipchak". History of Civilizations of Central Asia, Volume IV: The Age of Achievement AD 750 to the End of the Fifteenth Century. Motilal Banarsidass. pp. 61–76. ISBN 978-81-208-1595-7.
- Damgaard, P. B.; et al. (May 9, 2018). "137 ancient human genomes from across the Eurasian steppes". Nature. 557 (7705). Nature Research: 369–373. Bibcode:2018Natur.557..369D. doi:10.1038/s41586-018-0094-2. hdl:1887/3202709. PMID 29743675. S2CID 13670282. Archived from the original on February 21, 2020.
- Faizrakhmanov G., "Ancient Turks in Sibiria and Central Asia" Kazan, 'Master Lain', 2000, ISBN 5-93139-069-3
- Gumilev L.N., "Ancient Turks", Moscow, 'Science', 1967
- Gumilev L.N., "Hunnu in China", Moscow, 'Science', 1974
- Kimball L., "The Vanished Kimak Empire", Western Washington U., 1994
- Pletneva S.A., "Kipchaks", Moscow, 'Science', 1990, ISBN 5-02-009542-7
