= Lanikaz =

Medieval Turkic tribe of the Kimek confederation

The Lanikaz (Arabic: Nilqāz) was a Turkic tribe or clan. They were one of seven original tribes that made up the Kimek confederation. They originated from the Central Asian steppes.

The Lanikaz were one of seven original tribes that made up the Kimek confederation, along with the Imur/Imi, Imak Tatar, Kipchak, Bayandur, and Ajlad. The Kimek tribes originated in the Central Asian steppes and had migrated to the territory of present-day Kazakhstan. The Lanikaz, as part of the Kimek, were mentioned by Gardizi. Their ethnonym may be derived from alan-i-kaz(ar) meaning "Khazar Alans". V. F. Minorsky rendered the name as Nilkaz, S. Agajanov as Nilkar. S. M. Akhindjanov connected the name Nilkaz to the Nilkan clan of the Mongolian tribe of jalayir. S. Divitçioğlu rendered it Nilqas.

Y. Zuev calls the spelling "Lanikaz" an 'obviously distorted name of the Kimek tribe in the Gardizi list', and corrects it to Laktan, which Zuev further links to Middle Chinese 駱駝 *lɑk̚ dɑ "camel". The location of the Kimek Laktan 落坦 (Luotan < MC: *lɑk̚-tʰɑn^{X}) (Note: also known as 落俎 Luozu < MC: *lɑk̚-t͡ʃɨʌ^{X} & included among with the Shiwei people), before the Kimek's return to the area of Black Irtysh, in the Chinese annals is described as east from the lake Külün on the northern left bank of the river Argun. Zuev observes that Chinese annals contain a 'number of messages about congratulatory visits of Kimeks-Laktans to Chang'an, attesting to the political importance of this tribe. They do not contain any other information.'

== Sources ==
- Zuev Yu.A., "Early Türks: Essays on history and ideology", Almaty, Daik-Press, 2002, ISBN 9985-4-4152-9 (In Russian)
- Agajanov, S. G. (1992). "The States of the Oghuz, the Kimek and the Kipchak". History of Civilizations of Central Asia, Volume IV: The Age of Achievement AD 750 to the End of the Fifteenth Century. Motilal Banarsidass. pp. 61–76. ISBN 978-81-208-1595-7.
- Bosworth, C. Edmund (15 May 2017). The Turks in the Early Islamic World. Taylor & Francis. pp. 192–. ISBN 978-1-351-88087-9.
- Pletneva S.A., "Kipchaks", Moscow, "Science", 1990, p. 74, ISBN 5-02-009542-7
- Kimball, Linda Amy (1994). "The Vanished Kimak Empire" (PDF). In Kaplan, Edward H.; Whisenhunt, Donald W. (eds.). Opuscula Altaica : Essays Presented in Honor of Henry Schwarz. Studies on East Asia. Vol. 18. Bellingham, Washington: East Asian Studies Press, Western Washington University. pp. 371–392. ISBN 0-914584-19-7.
- Divitçioğlu, Sencer (2008). Meta history: Egean beyliks. Eren. p. 74. ISBN 978-975-6372-40-1.
- Róna-Tas, András (1997). A honfoglaló magyar nép: bevezetés a korai magyar történelem ismeretébe. Balassi Kiadó. ISBN 9789635061402.
- Akerov, Tabyldy Abdramanovich (2005). Ancient Kyrgyz and the Great Steppe: following in the tracks of ancient Kyrgyz civilizations. Biyiktik. ISBN 978-9967-13-151-4.
