= Al-Sallami =

Abū ʿAlī al-Ḥusayn ibn Aḥmad al-Bayhaqī al-Sallāmī was a historian of the Sāmānid Empire who lived in the mid-10th century.

Ibn Funduq records that al-Sallāmī studied under Ibrahīm ibn Muḥammad al-Bayhaqī. According to al-Thaʿālibī, he served the Muḥtājid emirs Abū Bakr Muḥammad (d. 939) and Abū ʿAlī Čaghānī (r. 939–955).

Al-Sallāmī wrote an Arabic history of the governors of Khorasan, Kitāb wulāt Khurāsān, which is now lost. It is known only from citations in the works of others, primarily Gardīzī and Ibn al-Athīr, both of whom cite him for the death of Abū ʿAlī Čaghānī and nothing later than that. In some cases, Gardīzī quotes him outright. He appears to have shaped a narrative favourable to the Muḥtājids. The Kitāb wulāt Khurāsān is also cited in Yāqūt's Irshād, Ibn Mākūlā's Kitāb al-Ikmāl and Ibn Khallikān. Juwaynī in the 13th century is the latest author to cite it.

According to Yāqūt, al-Sallāmī also wrote a Kitāb al-wuzarā ('Book of the Viziers').

== Bibliography ==
- Bartold, Vasily (1928). Turkestan Down to the Mongol Invasion. Translated by H. A. R. Gibb (2nd ed.). Oxford University Press.
- Bosworth, C. E. (1995). "Al-Sallāmī". In Bosworth, C. E.; van Donzel, E.; Heinrichs, W. P. & Lecomte, G. (eds.). The Encyclopaedia of Islam, Second Edition. Volume VIII: Ned–Sam. Leiden: E. J. Brill. pp. 996–997. ISBN 978-90-04-09834-3.
- Bosworth, C. E., ed. (2018). The Ornament of Histories: A History of the Eastern Islamic Lands AD 650–1041 — The Persian Text of Abu Sa'id 'Abd al-Hayy Gardizi. I. B. Tauris.
