= Bayandur (tribe) =

Medieval Oghuz Turkic tribe of the Kimek confederation

Bayundur
Bayındır
- Tamgha of Bayundur, which represents Falcon according to Mahmud al-Kashgari

Regions with significant populations
- Iran, Azerbaijan, Turkey, Turkmenistan

Languages
- Oghuz Turkic

Religion
- Islam

Related ethnic groups
- Oghuz Turks

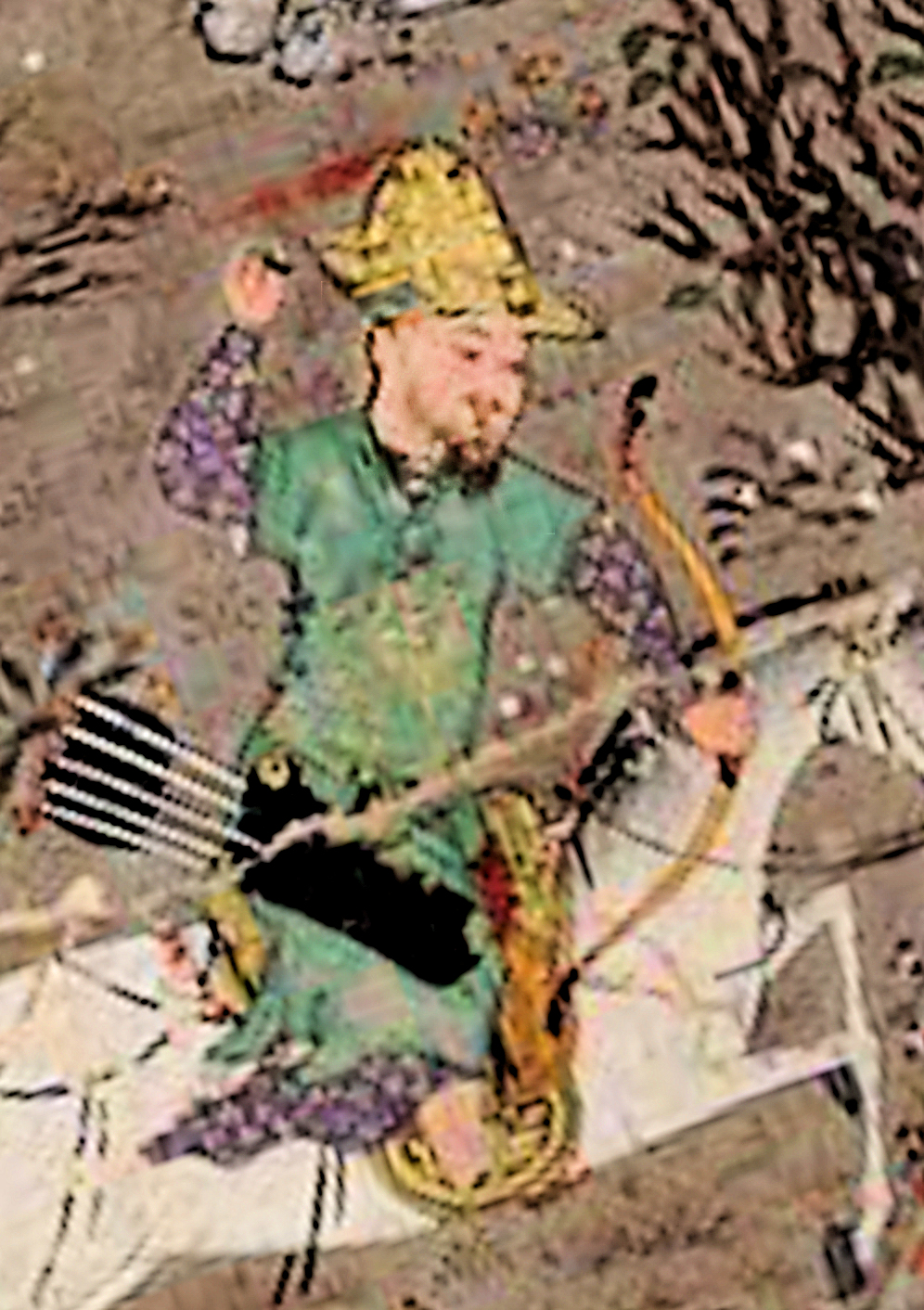
Uzun Hasan on horse, 1460s–1470s.

The Bayandur (Azerbaijani: Bayandur, Turkish: Bayındır, Turkmen: Baýyndyr), also spelled Bayundur or Bayindir, is an Oghuz Turkic tribe. Originally one of the 7 original tribes that made up the Kimek–Kipchak confederation, they later joined the Oghuz Turks. The Bayandur originated from Central Asia.

== History ==
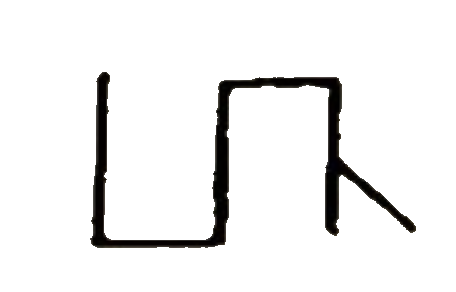
Selçukname variant

The Bayandur are known from Arab and Persian sources.

The Bayandur was one of the 7 original tribes that made up the Kimek confederation, along with the Imur/Imi, Imak Tatar, Kipchak, Lanikaz and Ajlad. The Kimek tribes originated in the Central Asian steppes, and had migrated to the territory of present-day Kazakhstan. The Bayandur, as part of the Kimek, were mentioned by Gardizi.

The Bayandur left the Kimek and joined the Oghuz. After disintegrating, half of the tribe united with the Kipchaks. While part of the Oghuz, they were mentioned by Kashgari. They were described in the Russian annals on 11th-century events while part of the Kipchaks.

=== Aq Qoyunlu ===
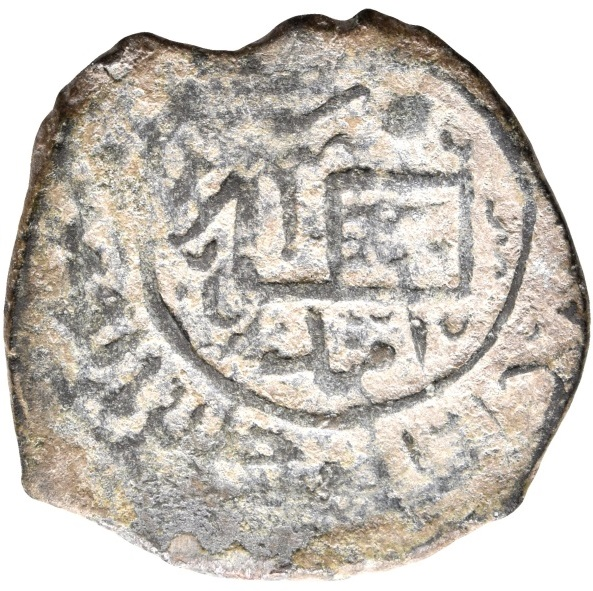
Anonymous Aq Qoyunlu fals having the Bayindir tribe symbol

The Aq Qoyunlu was referred to as Bayanduriyye in Iranian and Ottoman sources. Their sultans claimed descent from Bayindir Khan, which was a grandson of Oghuz Khagan, the legendary ancestor of Oghuz Turks.

Professor G. L. Lewis:

The Ak-koyunlu Sultans claimed descent from Bayindir Khan and it is likely, on the face of it, that the Book of Dede Korkut was composed under their patronage. The snag about this is that in the Ak-koyunlu genealogy Bayindir's father is named as Gok ('Sky') Khan, son of the eponymous Oghuz Khan, whereas in our book he is named as Kam Ghan, a name otherwise unknown. In default of any better explanation, I therefore incline to the belief that the book was composed before Ak-koyunlu rulers had decided who their ancestors where. It was in 1403 that they ceased to be tribal chiefs and became Sultans, so we may assume that their official genealogy was formulated round about that date.

Uzun Hasan used to assert the claim that he was an "honorable descendant of Oghuz Khan and his grandson, Bayandur Khan". In a letter dating to the year 1470, which was sent to Şehzade Bayezid, the-then governor of Amasya, Uzun Hasan wrote that those from the Bayandur and Bayat tribes, as well as other tribes that belonged to the "Oghuz il", and formerly inhabited Mangyshlak, Khwarazm and Turkestan, came and served in his court. He also made the tamga of the Bayandur tribe the symbol of his state. For this reason, the Bayandur tamga is found in Aq Qoyunlu coins, their official documents, inscriptions and flags.

== Bayundur today ==
Today in Turkmenistan, there is a village called Baýyndyroý in the Konye-Urgench district of the Daşoguz Region and a spring called Bagandar in Magtymguly District of the Balkan Region. There are also urugs (small clans) called Baýyndyr among the Turkmen tribes of Gökleň and Çandyr. Also, there is a village in Zanjan, Iran with name Bayindur. This village is located in the south of Zanjan city.

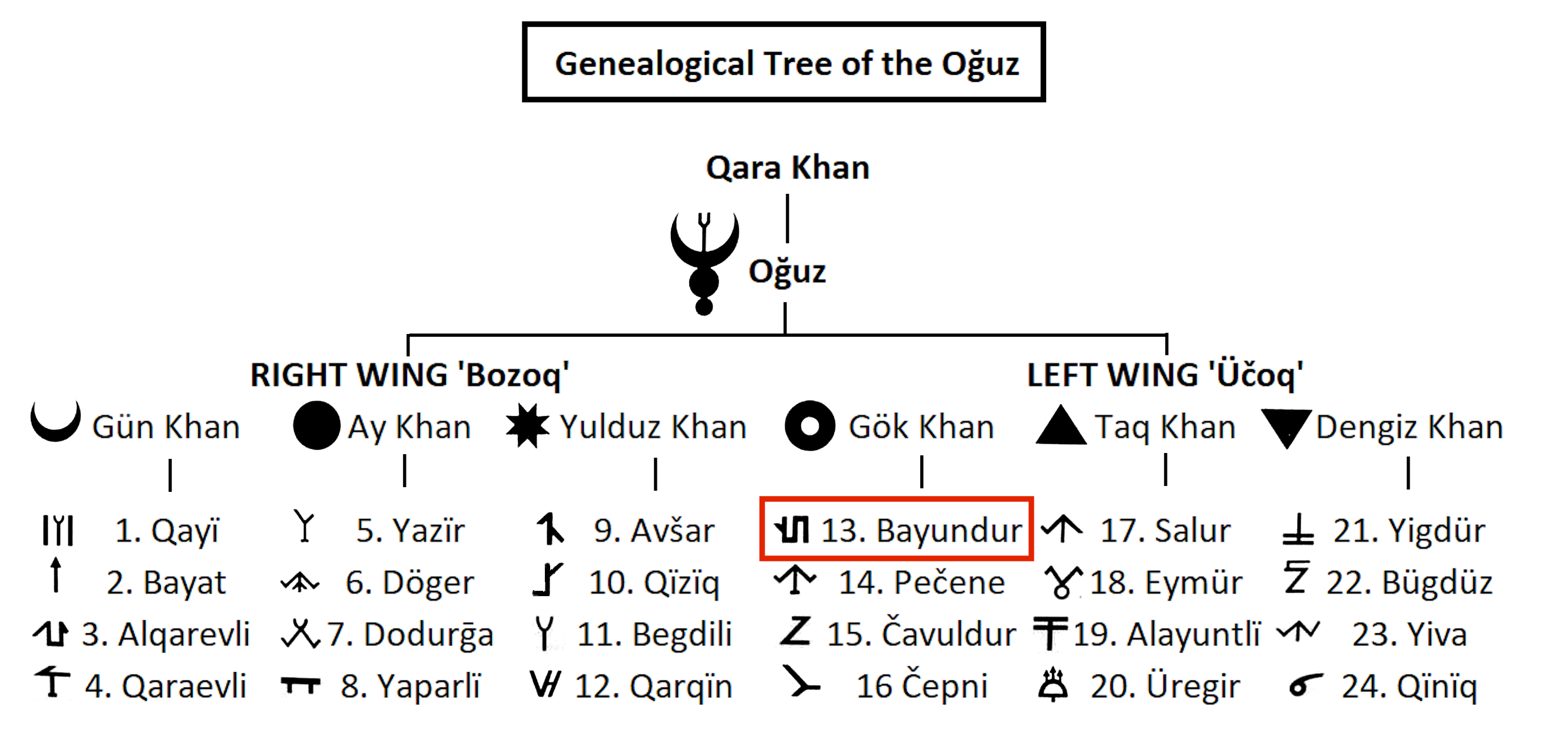
Bayundur Khan genealogical tree

== See also ==
- Fazel Khan Garrusi

== Sources ==
- Agajanov, S. G. (1992). "The States of the Oghuz, the Kimek and the Kipchak". History of Civilizations of Central Asia, Volume IV: The Age of Achievement AD 750 to the End of the Fifteenth Century. Motilal Banarsidass. pp. 61–76. ISBN 978-81-208-1595-7.
- Bosworth, C. Edmund (15 May 2017). The Turks in the Early Islamic World. Taylor & Francis. pp. 192–. ISBN 978-1-351-88087-9.
- Kimball, L. (1994). The Vanished Kimak Empire. Western Washington U. pp. 371–373.
- Pletneva, S.A. (1990). Kipchaks. Moscow: Nauka. p. 74. ISBN 5-02-009542-7.
