= Ajlad =

Medieval Turkic tribe of the Kimek confederation

The Ajlad was a Turkic tribe or clan. They were one of seven original tribes that made up the Kimek confederation. They originated from the Central Asian steppes.

The Ajlad were one of seven original tribes that made up the Kimek confederation, along with the Imur/Imi, Imak, Tatar, Kipchak, Bayandur and Lanikaz. The Kimek tribes originated in the Central Asian steppes and had migrated to the territory of present-day Kazakhstan. The Ajlad, as part of the Kimek, were mentioned by Gardizi.

== Sources ==
- Agajanov, S. G. (1992). "The States of the Oghuz, the Kimek and the Kipchak". History of Civilizations of Central Asia, Volume IV: The Age of Achievement AD 750 to the End of the Fifteenth Century. Motilal Banarsidass. pp. 61–76. ISBN 978-81-208-1595-7.
- Bosworth, C. Edmund (15 May 2017). The Turks in the Early Islamic World. Taylor & Francis. pp. 192–. ISBN 978-1-351-88087-9.
- Kimball, L. (1994). The Vanished Kimak Empire. Western Washington University. pp. 371–373.
- Necef, Ekber N. (2005). Karahanlılar. Selenge Yayınları. ISBN 978-975-8839-30-8.
