= Kashgari =

Kashgari is a Uyghur family name, meaning "the one from city of Kashgar". Kashgar is a historic city in Xinjiang Uyghur Autonomous region in China. The name may refer to:

- Abdur Rahman Kashgari (1912-1971), Scholar of Uyghur background
- Hamza Kashgari (born 1989), Saudi columnist with Uyghur background
- Mahmud al-Kashgari, eleventh century Uyghur Turkic scholar from Kashgar
