= Sharaf al-Zaman al-Marwazi =

Physician and author of the "Nature of Animals"

Sharaf al-Zamān Ṭāhir al-Marwazī or Marvazī (Arabic: شرف الزمان طاهر المروزي; fl. 1056/57–1124/25 CE) was a physician and author of Nature of Animals (كتاب طبائع الحيوان البحري والبري Kitāb Ṭabāʾiʿ al-Ḥayawān al-Baḥrī wa-al-Barrī).

He was a native of Merv, part of the Khorasan region in modern-day Turkmenistan.

== Nature of Animals ==
Al-Marwazī drew upon the works of Aristotle, Dioscorides, Galen, Oribasius, Timotheos of Gaza, Paul of Aegina, and the Muslim scholar Al-Jahiz. The work comprises five parts:

- On human beings
- On domestic and wild quadrupeds
- On land and marine birds
- On venomous creatures
- On marine animals

== Physician ==
Al-Marwazi served as physician at the courts of the Seljuk Sultan Malik-Shah I and his successors. As a physician, he recorded observations of parasitic worms.

== Bibliography ==
- Minorsky, V. (1942). Sharaf al-Zaman Tahir Marvazi on China, the Turks and India. London: The Royal Asiatic Society. p. 234.
