= Kumo Xi =

207–907 AD Mongolic steppe people of Northeast China

The Kumo Xi (traditional Chinese: 庫莫奚; simplified Chinese: 库莫奚; pinyin: Kùmò Xī), also known as the Tatabi (Old Turkic: 𐱃𐱃𐰉𐰃, romanized: Tatabï), were ancient steppe people located in modern Northeast China from 207 to 907 AD. After the death of their ancestor Tadun in 207, they were no longer called Wuhuan but joined the Khitan Xianbei in submitting to the Yuwen Xianbei. Their history is closely linked to the more famous Khitan.

The Kumo Xi engaged in conflicts with numerous Chinese dynasties and with the Khitan tribes, eventually suffering a series of disastrous defeats to Chinese armies and coming under the domination of the Khitans. In 907, the Kumo Xi were completely assimilated into the Khitan-led Liao dynasty of China.

== Etymology ==
Omeljan Pritsak reconstructs the ethnonym underlying Middle Chinese *kʰuo^{H}-mɑk̚-ɦei as qu(o)mâġ-ġay. The first element qu(o)mâġ is from *quo "yellowish" plus denominal suffix *-mAk, cognate with Mongolian qumaġ "fine sands" and with Turkic qumaq and qum. As for *ɦei, Christopher Atwood (2010) proposed that it reflects an i-suffixed form of OC 胡 *gâ > hú. Further, gâ is etymologically uncertain.

Peter Benjamin Golden (2003 & 2006) proposes for Qay several Mongolic etymologies: ɣai "trouble, misfortune, misery", χai "interjection of grief", χai "to seek", χai "to hew", albeit none compelling.

Pritsak proposes that the qu(o)mâġ-ġay comprised two Proto-Mongolic groups: the Qu(o)mâġ, whom he linked to the Kimek and the Qun/Cumans (whose ethnonym possibly meant "yellow") and the Qay proper. However, Golden thinks that qu(o)mâġ-ġay simply means "desert Qay" or "sand Qay", referring to their earlier habitat.

As for the exonym Tatabï given to Kumo Xi by Göktürks, Yury Zuev (2002) compares Tatabï to Avestan tata apo and proposes an etymology from Iranic *tata-api "falling waters", after having noted that the name of a Xī-(奚)-associated tribe Bái-Xí 白霫 (< MC *bˠæk̚-ziɪp̚) literally meant "white downpour/torrent" in Chinese, and that the Xī (奚) and Xí (霫) occupied the same area, Zhongjing (中京).

== Origin ==
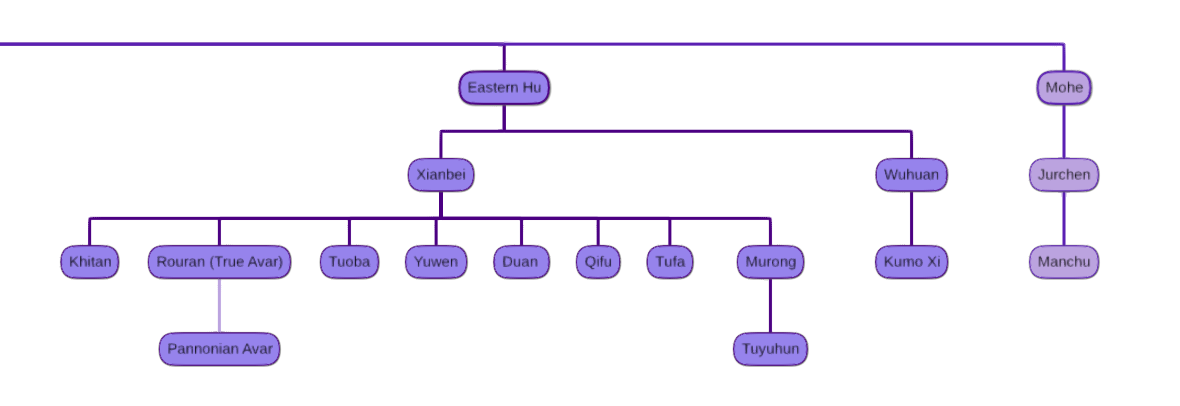
Lineage of the Kumo Xi

The Kumo Xi were descendants of the Wuhuan. The Book of the Later Han records that "the language and culture of the Xianbei are the same as the Wuhuan". Along with the Xianbei, the Wuhuan formed part of the proto-Mongolic Donghu confederation in the 4th century BC. The Book of Wei (Description of the Khitan, Vol. 1000, 2221) records that the Kumo Xi and Khitans (descendants of the Xianbei) spoke the same language.

The Book of Wei (Description of the Khitan, Vol. 100, 2223) records:

契丹國, 在庫莫奚東, 異種同類, 俱竄於松漠之間. 登國中, 國軍大破之, 遂逃迸, 與庫莫奚分背.
The Khitan state was situated east of the Kumo Xi. They were different ethnic groups but belonged to the same ethnic stock, and fled to the region of Songmo together. During the period of Dengguo (386–395), they were severely defeated by the imperial troops. Therefore, they (the Khitan) fled in disorder and split off from the Kumo Xi.

The Book of Sui records:

奚本曰庫莫奚, 東部胡之種.
The Xi were originally called the Kumo Xi. They were of Donghu origin.

The New Book of Tang records:

奚亦東胡種, 為匈奴所破, 保烏丸山. 漢曹操斬其帥蹋頓蓋其後也.
The Xi were also of Donghu (the eastern barbarians) origin. They were defeated by the Xiongnu (under Modu Chanyu), and then sought refuge in the Wuwan Mountains. During the Han dynasty, Cao Cao killed their leader Tadun. (The Xi) were the descendants.

== History ==
In 388 AD, the Kumo Xi and Khitans fought with the Xianbei-led Northern Wei dynasty. The conflict severely weakened the Kumo Xi while the Khitans were not as badly affected, resulting in their split into separate polities.

By the early Tang dynasty (around the 7th century AD), the Kumo Xi now called the, Xi had become subordinate to the Khitans. After the Khitans' Li-Sun Rebellion (696–697) and revolt of Ketuyu (730–734), the Xi regained their position of dominance. The Xi then entered a golden age, lasting from approximately 755 to 847. During this period the Xi were friendly with An Lushan, and supported An in his rebellion (756–763), frequently plundering Han territories in this period. This aggressive policy seems to have consumed Xi forces, especially weakening their demographic vitality, allowing the less aggressive Khitans to dominate them. Xi raids into Tang territory provoked successive heavy responses from the Tang court, resulting in battles in the 760s and in 795 that were disastrous for the Xi. After 795, the Xi became a tributary people to the Tang.

The Uyghur Khaganate (744–840) collapsed in the 840's. When the Tang dynasty simultaneously displayed signs of division, the Xi rose in rebellion in 847, and were subsequently and disastrously defeated by Zhang Zhongwu, the frontier commander of Lulong. The Xi were never able to recover from this defeat. In the late ninth century the Khitans rose to eventually absorb the remnants of Xi people, and established the Liao dynasty in 907.

== Cultural heritage ==
It is believed that the Xiqin, a bowed, stringed instrument that is the ancestor of the Chinese Erhu, the Mongolian khuuchir and morin khuur, was derived from a Xi instrument.

== See also ==
- Proto-Mongols
