= Yury Zuev =

Russian sinologist and turkologist (1932–2006)

Yuri Alexeyevich Zuev or Zuyev (Russian: Ю́рий Алексе́евич Зу́ев; 8 December 1932 – 5 December 2006) was a Russian-born Kazakhstani sinologist and turkologist.

== Biography ==
Zuev was born in the Siberian city of Tyumen in a white-collar family. Zuev studied at the Leningrad State University and majored in the historical studies of the Eastern Asian countries, successfully learning Classical Chinese, Middle Chinese, and modern Chinese. In 1955, Zuev received a B.A. diploma and was sent to work in the Institute of History, Archeology and Ethnography of the Kazakh SSR Academy of Sciences. He received his Ph.D. in 1967. His PhD thesis "Ancient Turkic genealogical legends as a source on early history of Turkic people" included a number of new discoveries about the socio-political history of the Turks, suggested the etymology of the name of the Ashina tribe, traced the historical past of the Turkic tribes in the Chinese genealogical legends, and suggested a hypothesis about an ethnic triumvirate of Ashina-Ashide-Basmyl. The main finding of his thesis was the etymology of the name of the Kagan tribe Ashina.

Zuev was a collaborator in important editions of the USSR history: "Historical Atlas of the USSR peoples", "Historical atlas of the Kazakh SSR", and five-volume edition "History of the Kazakh SSR from most ancient times to the present". The mass of Zuev's work included analysis of the Kazakhstan and Central Asian political history from the 3rd century BC to the 3rd century AD, history of ancient and medieval periods, ethnic composition and movement of tribes in the Western Turkic Kaganate, and pre-Mongolian period (10th–12th centuries) history. Zuev wrote about the genesis, ethnic composition and political history of the Türgesh Kaganate.

After the fall of the USSR, Zuev was able to publish a number of works on ancient and medieval history of nomadic peoples of the Central Asia and Kazakhstan. These include "Sarmato-Alans of Aral (Yancai\Abzoya)" (1995), "Ancient Turkic social terminology in the Chinese texts of the 8th century" (1998), "Creation of Türgesh Kaganate: history and tradition" (1996), "Forms of the ethno-social organization of Central Asia nomadic peoples in antiquity and Middle Ages: pied horde, centuria (comparative – typological study)" (1998), "Kypchak Urbe-khan in epos and history" (2001), "Manichaeism and Talas (interpretation of Ancient Turkic inscriptions)" (2002).

Zuev's 70th birthday in 2002 coincided with the publication of his lifetime work, a monograph "Early Turks: Sketches of history and ideology", followed by "A Strongest Tribe" (2004) and "Seyanto Kaganate and Kimeks (Central Asian Turkic ethnogeography in the middle of the 7th century)" (2004).

His bibliography comprises approximately 40 major works.

== Selected works ==
- Question on mutual relations of Usuns and Kanju with Huns and China in the second half of the 1st century B.C. (Campaign of Hun Shanyu Chzhichzhi to the West) // News of Kazakh Academy of Sciences, Series of History, Economy, Philosophy and Law, Issue 2 (5), Alma-Ata, 1957, p. 62–72
- Question of ancient Usuns language // Bulletin of Kazakh Academy of Sciences, No 5 (146), 1957, p. 61–74.
- The term "kyrkun" (Question of Kyrgyz' ethnic origin in Chinese sources) // Works of History Institute of Kirgiz SSR Academy of Sciences, Issue IV, Frunze, 1958, p. 169-175
- The Kirgiz inscription from Sudja. // the Soviet Oriental Studies, № 3, 1958. p. 133–135.
- Horse Tamgas from Vassal Princedoms, (Translation of the Chinese composition of VIII – X centuries Tanhuyyao) // Works of History, Archaeology and Ethnography Institute, 1960, Vol. VIII, p. 93–140
- Chinese news about Suyab // News Kazakh Academy of Sciences. Series of History, archaeology and ethnography, Alma-Ata, 1960. Issue 3 (14). pp. 87–96.
- Ethnic history of Usuns. // Works of Institute of History, archaeology and ethnography Kazakh Academy of Sciences. Vol. VIII. Alma–Ata, 1960. pp. 5–25.
- From Ancient Türkic etnonymy in Chinese sources // Works of Institute of History, Archaeology and Ethnography of Kazakh Academy of Sciences. Vol. XV. Alma-Ata, 1962. pp. 104–122.
- Ancient Türkic genealogic legends as a source on early history of Türks. (Author's abstract of PhD dissertation), Alma-Ata, 1967
- Semantics of ethnonym Imur/Imir // News of Turkmen SSR Academy of Sciences, Issue 4, Ashkhabad, 1968, pp. 95–96
- Kirgiz – Buruts // Soviet Ethnography. No 4, М., 1970.
- Rashid ad-din "Djami at-Tavarih" as a source on early history of Djalairs //Eastern Written monuments, М., 1972. pp. 178–185
- Yuechji and Kushans in Chinese sources // Central Asia in Kushan epoch, Vol. 1, 1974.
- Political history of Huns, Usuns and Kangyui (Kangar) / History of Kazakh SSR, Alma–Ata, 1977, Vol. 1, pp. 284–293.
- Western Türkic Kaganate / History of Kazakh SSR, Alma-Ata, 1977, Vol. 1, pp. 321–336.
- Invasion of Kidans / History of Kazakh SSR, Alma-Ata, 1979, Vol. 2, pp. 33–37.
- Karahytai in Jeti-su / History of Kazakh SSR, Alma-Ata, 1979, Vol. 2. pp. 38–43.
- Ethnocultural connections of early Kimeks // News of Kazakhstan Republic Academy of Sciences, Almaty, 1992, No 5, pp. 26–38.
- Sarmato-Alans of Aral (Yancai\Abzoya) // Culture of nomads at boundary of centuries (XIX-ХХ, ХХ-XXI centuries): problems of genesis and transformation. (Materials of the International conference), Almaty, 1995. pp. 38–68.
- Creation of Türgesh Kaganate: History and tradition // Evolution of Kazakhstan statehood. Almaty, 1996. pp. 30–34.
- Semantics of the term "Karluk" // Evolution of Kazakhstan statehood, Almaty, 1996, pp. 35–39.
- Ancient Türkic social terminology in Chinese text of VIII century // Questions of Kazakhstan archaeology, Almaty-Moscow, 1998, Issue 2, pp. 153–161.
- Forms of ethno-social organization of nomadic peoples in Central Asia in antiquity and Middle Ages: pied horde, centuria (comparative - typological study) // Military art of nomads of Central Asia and Kazakhstan (Antiquity Epoch and Middle Ages), Almaty, 1998, pp. 49–100.
- Kypchak Urbe-khan in epochs and history // Ancient Türkic civilization: monuments of writing. Almaty, 2001, pp. 419–430.
- Early Türks: Essays on History and Ideology, Almaty, 2002,
- A Strongest Tribe. Historical and cultural interrelations of Iran and Dasht-i Kipchak, Almaty, 2004, pp. 31–68.
- Seyanto Kaganate and Kimeks (Türkic etnogeography. Central Asia in the middle of the VII century) // Shygys, No 1, pp. 11–22, No 2, pp. 3–26, 2004

== References and sources ==
- Shukhovtsov V.K., Torlanbaeva K.U., "Scholar Yu.A. Zuev", Tugan ulke (Native land), Almaty, 2005, No 4 // Шуховцов В.К., Торланбаева К.У. "Ученый Ю.А. Зуев", Туган ульке (Родной край), Алматы, 2005, No 4 (In Russian)
- Torlanbaeva K.U., "In glorious memory of the teacher", Shygys - East, 2006, No 1 // Торланбаева К.У. Светлой памяти учителя // Shygys - Восток, 1, 2006 (In Russian)
- Shymyrbaeva G. "In memory of the scientist", News of al-Farabi Kazakh National University, Philological series, Almaty, 2006, No 1 (91) // Шымырбаева Г. Памяти ученого // Вестник Казахского Национального университета им. аль-Фараби. Серия филологическая. Алматы, 2006, 1 (91) 2006 (In Russian)
- "Chingiz-name. Utemish-hoji." Facsimile, translation, transcription, textological notes, V.P.Udin research, Almaty, 1992, ISBN 5-628-01309-9 // "Чингиз-наме. Утемиш-ходжи." Факсимиле, перевод, транскрипция,текстологические примечания, исследования В.П. Юдина. Алма-Ата, 1992 ISBN 5-628-01309-9 (In Russian)
