= Gardizi =

11th-century Persian historian and official

- گردیزی
- Born: Abū Saʿīd ʿAbd-al-Ḥayy ibn Żaḥḥāk ibn Maḥmūd Gardīzī; Unknown; Gardiz, Zamindawar (modern-day Afghanistan)
- Died: 1061 CE; Unknown
- Occupations: Historian, Geographer

Academic background
- Influences: al-Sallami, Ibn Khordadbeh, Jayhani, Ibn al-Muqaffa'

Academic work
- Era: Ghaznavid era
- Notable works: Zayn al-Akhbar

Abū Saʿīd ʿAbd-al-Ḥayy ibn Żaḥḥāk ibn Maḥmūd Gardīzī (Persian: ابوسعید عبدالحی بن ضحاک بن محمود گردیزی), better known as Gardizi (گردیزی), was an 11th-century Persian historian and official, who is notable for having written the Zayn al-akhbar, one of the earliest history books written in New Persian.

Little is known of Gardizi personally. He was probably from Gardiz in the region of Zamindawar, as his nisba implies. His father's name was Zahhak, a name that was seemingly popular in the region. Gardizi started his career as an official of the Ghaznavid monarch Mahmud of Ghazni (r. 998–1030), and was an eyewitness to many of the events that occurred under the latter. In his Zayn al-akbar, Gardizi took a dispassionate view of history which was fairly remarkable for its time. It consisted of a history of the pre-Islamic kings of Iran, Muhammad and the Caliphs until the year 1032. Included is a history of the Arab conquest of Khorasan, which it is believed Gardizi was using al-Sallami as a source. His history concerning the Turks was written using Ibn Khordadbeh, Jayhani and Ibn al-Muqaffa' as sources. He may have been a student of al-Biruni, since the Zayn al-akbar contains information concerning Indian festivals.

== Sources ==
- Bosworth, C. Edmund (2013). "Gardīzī". In Fleet, Kate; Krämer, Gudrun; Matringe, Denis; Nawas, John; Rowson, Everett (eds.). Encyclopaedia of Islam (3rd ed.). Brill Online. doi:10.1163/1573-3912_ei3_COM_27374. ISSN 1873-9830.
- Bosworth, C. Edmund (2000). "Gardīzī, Abū Saʿīd ʿAbd-al-Ḥayy". Encyclopaedia Iranica, Vol. X, Fasc. 3. pp. 314–315.
- Yarshater, Ehsan; Melville, Charles (2012). Persian Historiography: History of Persian Literature A, Volume 10. I.B.Tauris. ISBN 9780857721402.
