= Kurya =

Kurya may refer to:

- Kurya (khan), Pecheneg khan
- Kurya people, an ethnic group living in Mwanza, Tanzania
- Kurya (rural locality), several rural localities in Russia
