= Pechenegs =

Extinct Turkic people

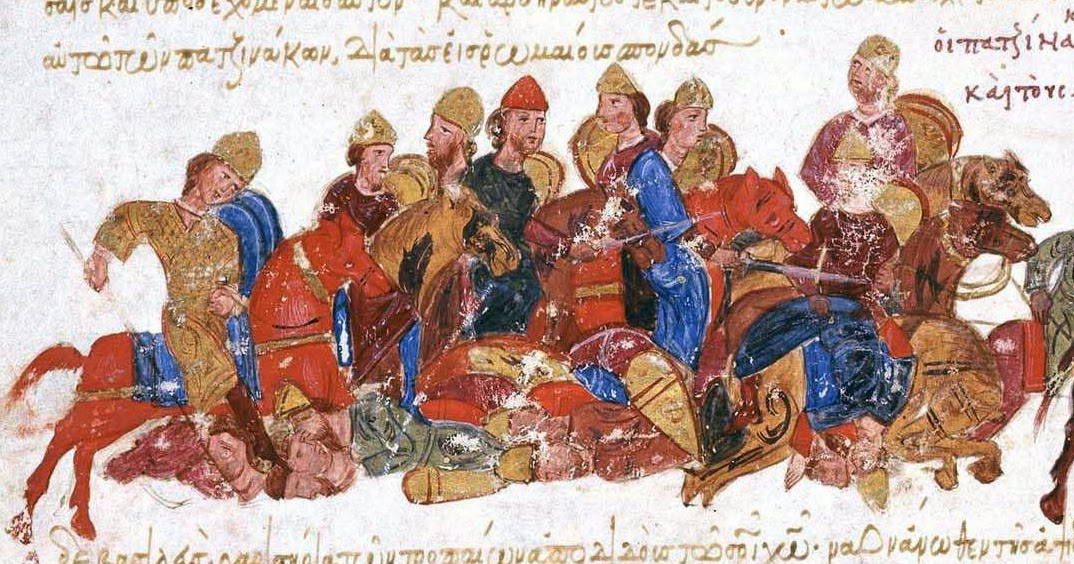
- The Pechenegs slaughter the Varangian army of Rus, from the Madrid Skylitzes.

Regions with significant populations
- Eastern Europe, Anatolia (historical)

Languages
- Pecheneg language (historical)

Related ethnic groups
- Oghuz Turks and Cumans

Pecheneg Khanates
- 889–1091
- Pecheneg Khanates and neighbouring territories, c.1030
- Status: Khanate
- Common languages: Pecheneg
- History
  - Established: 889
  - Disestablished: 1091
Preceded by	Succeeded by
Khazar Khaganate	Kipchaks

The Pechenegs (/ˈpɛtʃənɛɡ/) or Patzinaks, (Note: Karakhanid: بَجَنَكْ Bäčänäk; Romanian: Pecenegi, Russian: Печенег(и), Ukrainian: Печеніг(и), Hungarian: Besenyő(k), Greek: Πατζινάκοι, Πετσενέγοι, Πατζινακίται, Georgian: პაჭანიკი, Bulgarian: печенеги, romanized: pechenegi, Bulgarian: печенези, pechenezi; Serbo-Croatian: Pečenezi/Печенези, Latin: Pacinacae, Bisseni) were a semi-nomadic Turkic people from Central Asia who spoke the Pecheneg language. In the 9th and 10th centuries, the Pechenegs controlled much of the steppes of southeast Europe and the Crimean Peninsula. In the 9th century, the Pechenegs began a period of wars against Rus', and for more than two centuries launched raids into the lands of Rus', which sometimes escalated into full-scale wars.

== Ethnonym ==
The Pechenegs were mentioned as Bjnak, Bjanak or Bajanak in medieval Arabic and Persian texts, as Be-ča-nag in Classical Tibetan documents, and as Pačanak-i in works written in Georgian. Anna Komnene and other Byzantine authors referred to them as Patzinakoi or Patzinakitai. In medieval Latin texts, the Pechenegs were referred to as Pizenaci, Bisseni or Bessi. East Slavic peoples use the terms Pečenegi or Pečenezi (plural of Pečeneg), while the Poles mention them as Pieczyngowie or Piecinigi. The Hungarian word for Pecheneg is besenyő; the Romanian term is Pecenegi.

According to Max Vasmer and some other researchers the ethnonym Pecheneg may have derived from the Old Turkic word for "brother-in-law, relative" (eg. Turkish: bacanak), implying that it initially referred to an "in-law related clan or tribe". Peter Golden considers this derivation by no means certain.

In Mahmud Kashgari's 11th-century work Dīwān Lughāt al-Turk, the Pechenegs were described as "a Turkic nation living around the country of the Rum" (Rum was the Turkic word for the Eastern Roman Empire or Anatolia) and "a branch of Oghuz Turks"; he subsequently described the Oghuz as being formed of 22 branches, of which the Pecheneg were the 19th.

Pechenegs are mentioned as one of 24 ancient tribes of Oghuzes by 14th-century statesman and historian of Ilkhanate-ruled Iran Rashid-al-Din Hamadani in his work Jāmiʿ al-Tawārīkh ("Compendium of Chronicles") with the meaning of the ethnonym as "the one who shows eagerness". The 17th-century khan of Khiva and historian Abu al-Ghazi Bahadur mentions the Pechenegs as bechene among 24 ancient tribes of Turkmens (or Oghuzes) in his book Shajara-i Tarākima (Genealogy of the Turkmen) and provides for its meaning as "the one who makes".

Three of the eight Pecheneg "provinces" or clans were collectively known as Kangars. According to Constantine VII Porphyrogenitus, the Kangars received this denomination because "they are more valiant and noble than the rest" of the people "and that is what the title Kangar signifies". Because no Turkic word with a similar meaning is known, Ármin Vámbéry connected the ethnonym to the Kyrgyz words kangir ("agile"), kangirmak ("to go out riding") and kani-kara ("black-blooded"), while Carlile Aylmer Macartney associated it with the Chagatai word gang ("chariot"), semantically related to the Turkic Gaoche.

Omeljan Pritsak proposed that the name had initially been a composite term (Kängär As, mentioned in Old Turkic texts) deriving from the Tocharian word for stone (kank) and the ethnonym As, suggesting that they were Tocharian-speaking or at least formed a confederation consisting of Tocharian, Eastern Iranian and Bulgaric Turkic elements. Their connection with Eastern Iranian elements is hinted at in the remark of al-Biruni regarding a people that "are of the race of al-Lān and that of al-Ās and their language is a mixture of the languages of Khwarazmians and the Badjanak.".

However, Golden objected that *Aoruša would have yielded Ors/Urs and Pritsak's opinion on the Kengeres-Kangars' ethnonym and mixed Tocharian-Iranian origin remained "highly hypothetical".

If the latter assumption is valid, the Kangars' ethnonym suggests that (East) Iranian elements contributed to the formation of the Pecheneg people but Spinei concedes that Pechenegs were of "a predominantly Turkic character... beyond any doubt". This may be mirrored in the Old Rus translation of Josephus Flavius (ed. Meshcherskiy, 454) which adds "the Yas, as is known, descended from the Pecheneg tribe." Based on their fragmentary linguistic remains, scholars view them as Common Turkic-speakers, most probably Kipchak (Németh, followed by Ligeti) or Oguz (Baskakov). Hammer-Purgstall classifies the Chinese Kangju and Byzantine Kangar as purely Turkic name variants of the Kangly; however, Wang Pu's institutional historical work Tang Huiyao apparently distinguishes the Kang(ju) from the Kangheli (aka Kangly). Menges saw in Kang-ar-as the plural-suffix -as, and Klyashtorny the Turkic numerus collectivus -ar-, -er-.

== Language ==
Mahmud al-Kashgari, an 11th-century man of letters who specialized in Turkic dialects, argued that the language spoken by the Pechenegs was a variant of the Cuman and Oghuz idioms. He suggested that foreign influences on the Pechenegs gave rise to phonetic differences between their tongue and the idiom spoken by other Turkic peoples. Anna Komnene likewise stated that the Pechenegs and the Cumans shared a common language. Although the Pecheneg language itself died out centuries ago, the names of the Pecheneg "provinces" recorded by Constantine Porphyrogenitus prove that the Pechenegs spoke a Turkic language. The Pechenegs are thought to have belonged to the Oghuz branch of the Turkic family, but their language is poorly documented and therefore difficult to further classify.

== Composition ==
Byzantine emperor Constantine VII Porphyrogennetos lists eight Pecheneg tribal groupings, four on each side of the Dnieper river, reflecting the bipartite left-right Turkic organization. These eight tribes were, in turn, divided into 40 sub-tribes, probably clans. Constantine VII also records the names of eight former tribal leaders who had been leading the Pechenegs when they were expelled by the Khazars and Oghuzes. Golden, following Németh and Ligeti, proposes that each tribal name consists of two parts: the first part being an equine coat color, the other the tribal ruler's title.

The Erdim, Čur, and Yula tribes formed the Qangar/Kenger (Greek: Καγγαρ) and were deemed "more valiant and noble than the rest".

Tribal Compositions
Transcribed tribal name	Reconstructed tribal name	Meaning	Location	Transcribed leader's name	Reconstructed leader's name
Ιαβδι-ερτί(μ)	*Yavdı (Note: or "Yawdı")-Erdim (Note: or "Erdem")	Tribe of the Erdem (Note: bravery, virtue) with brilliant, shining horses	Dniepr's west bank	Βαϊτζαν	*Bay (Note: wealthy)-ča
Κουαρτζι-τζούρ	*Küerči (Note: From küverči < küğerči)-Čur	Tribe of the Čur with bluish horses	Dniepr's east bank	Κούελ	*Küğel (Note: bright-green)
Χαβουξιν-γυλά	*Qabuqšın-Yula or *Khabuži/Kapuži-Jula (Note: Possibly not an equine coat color; cf. Ottoman Turkish قاپو kapu "door, gate, Porte", Hung. kapu "gate, entrance, door". If so, this tribe was the guardians of the Pechenegs to the west.)	Tribe of the Yula with bark-colored horses	Dniepr's west bank	Κουρκοῡται	*Qorqutai (Note: From qorqut- "to frighten")
Συρου-κουλπέη	*Suru-Kül-Bey	Tribe of the Kül-Bey with grayish horses	Dniepr's east bank	Ιπαόν	*Ipa / *Iba (?), (Note: cf. Hung. Ipoch; may be Ipa + Hung. dim. suffix -cs (-ç).)
Χαρα-βοη	*Qara-Bay	Tribe of the Bey with black horses	Dniepr's west bank	Καϊδούμ	*Qaydum (Note: From qayt- < qayıt- < qaðıt- "to turn back"; cf. Hung. Kajdan)
Βορο-ταλμάτ	*Boru-Tolmač	Tribe of the Tolmač (Note: "interpreter, translator") with grayish horses	Dniepr's east bank	Κώσταν	*Qosta (Note: cf. Sağay qosta "foe-seeking magical arrow"(?))
Γιαζι-χοπὸν	*Yazı-Qap(ğ)an	Tribe of the Qap(ğ)an with dark-brown horses	Dniepr's west bank	Γιαζή	*Yazı (Note: From Yazığ, metathesis of Yağız)
Βουλα-τζοπόν	*Bula-Čopan (Note: or "Čaban")	Tribe of the Čopan with piebald horses	Dniepr's east bank	Βατᾱν	*Bata / *Bota (Note: "small camel")

== History ==
=== Origins and area ===
According to Omeljan Pritsak, the Pechenegs are descendants of the ancient Kangars who originate from Tashkent. The Orkhon inscriptions listed the Kangars among the subject peoples of the Eastern Turkic Khaganate. Pritsak says that the Pechenegs' homeland was located between the Aral Sea and the middle course of the Syr Darya along the important trade routes connecting Central Asia with Eastern Europe, and associates them with Kangars.

According to Constantine Porphyrogenitus writing in c. 950, the Pecheneg realm, or Patzinakia stretched west as far as the Siret River (or possibly the Eastern Carpathian Mountains), and was four days' journey from "Tourkias" (i.e. Hungary).

The whole of Patzinakia is divided into eight provinces with the same number of great princes. The provinces are these: the name of the first province is Irtim; of the second, Tzour; of the third, Gyla; of the fourth, Koulpeï; of the fifth, Charaboï; of the sixth, Talmat; of the seventh, Chopon; of the eighth, Tzopon. At the time at which the Pechenegs were expelled from their country, their princes were, in the province of Irtim, Baïtzas; in Tzour, Kouel; in Gyla, Kourkoutai; in Koulpeï, Ipaos; in Charaboï, Kaïdoum; in the province of Talmat, Kostas; in Chopon, Giazis; in the province of Tzopon, Batas.

— Constantine Porphyrogenitus: De Administrando Imperio

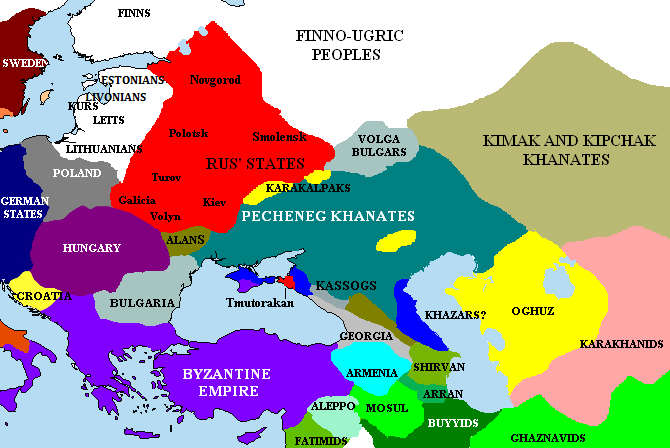
The Pontic steppes, c. 1015

Paul Pelliot originated the proposal that the Book of Sui—a 7th-century Chinese work—preserved the earliest record on the Pechenegs. The book mentioned a people named Bĕirù, who had settled near the Ēnqū and Alan peoples (identified as Onogurs and Alans, respectively), to the east of Fulin (or the Eastern Roman Empire). Victor Spinei emphasizes that the Pechenegs' association with the Bĕirù is "uncertain". He proposes that an 8th-century Uyghur envoy's report, which survives in Tibetan translation, contains the first certain reference to the Pechenegs. The report recorded an armed conflict between the Be-ča-nag and the Hor (Uyghurs or Oghuz Turks) peoples in the region of the Syr Darya.

Ibn Khordadbeh (c. 820 – 912 CE), Mahmud al-Kashgari (11th century), Muhammad al-Idrisi (1100–1165), and many other Muslim scholars agree that the Pechenegs belonged to the Turkic peoples. The Russian Primary Chronicle stated that the "Torkmens, Pechenegs, Torks, and Polovcians" descended from "the godless sons of Ishmael, who had been sent as a chastisement to the Christians".

=== Westward migration ===
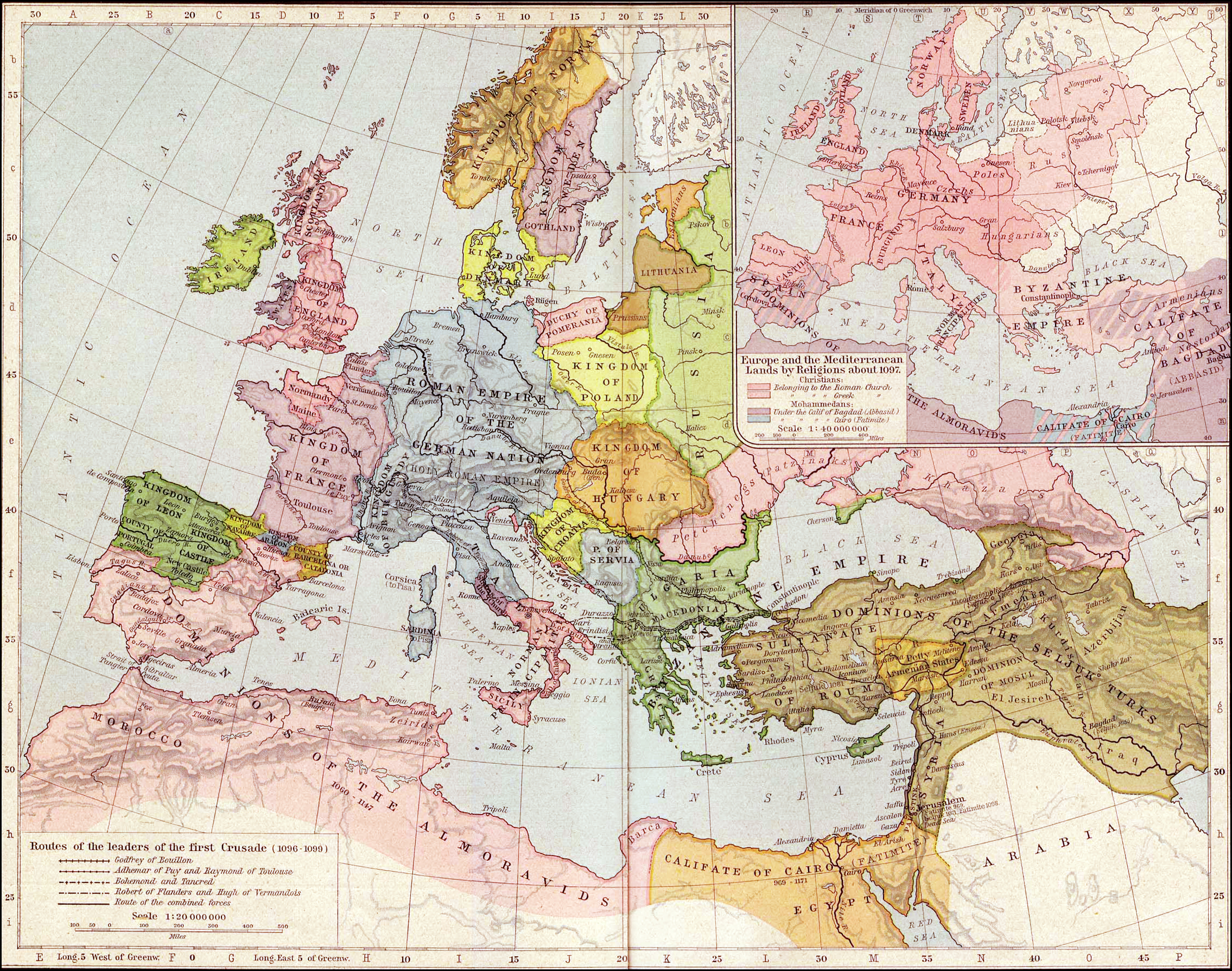
Europe 1097

The Turkic Khaganate collapsed in 744, which gave rise to a series of intertribal confrontations in the Eurasian steppes. The Karluks attacked the Oghuz Turks, forcing them to launch a westward migration towards the Pechenegs' lands. The Uyghur envoy's report testifies that the Oghuz and Pecheneg waged war against each other in the 8th century, most probably for the control of trade routes. The Oghuz allied with the Karluks and Kimaks and defeated the Pechenegs and their allies in a battle near the Aral Sea before 850, according to the 10th-century scholar Al-Masudi. Most Pechenegs then migrated towards the Volga River, but some groups were forced to join the Oghuz. The latter formed the 19th tribe of the Oghuz tribal federation in the 11th century.

The Pechenegs who left their homeland settled between the Ural and the Volga rivers. According to Gardizi and other Muslim scholars who based their works on 9th-century sources, the Pechenegs' new territory was quite large, with a 30-day-walk extension, and were bordered by the Cumans, Khazars, Oghuz Turks and Slavs.

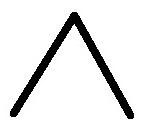
Tamga of Pecheneg tribe as per Abul-Ghazi's «Genealogy of Turkmens»

The same sources also narrate that the Pechenegs made regular raids against their neighbors, in particular against the Khazars and their vassals, the Burtas, and sold their captives into slavery. The Khazars allied with the Oghuz against the Pechenegs and attacked them from two directions. Outnumbered by the enemy, the Pechenegs were forced into a new westward migration. They marched across the Khazar Khaganate, invaded the dwelling places of the Hungarians, and expelled them from the lands along the Kuban River and the upper course of the river Donets. There is no consensual date for this second migration of the Pechenegs: Pritsak argues that it took place around 830, but Kristó suggests that it could hardly have occurred before the 850s.

The Pechenegs settled along the rivers Donets and Kuban. It is plausible that the distinction between the "Turkic Pechenegs" and "Khazar Pechenegs" mentioned in the 10th-century Hudud al-'alam had its origin in this period. The Hudud al-'Alam—a late 10th-century Persian geography—distinguished two Pecheneg groups, referring to those who lived along the Donets as "Turkic Pechenegs", and to those along the Kuban as "Khazarian Pechenegs". Spinei proposes that the latter denomination most probably refers to Pecheneg groups accepting Khazar suzerainty, implies that some Pecheneg tribes had been forced to acknowledge the Khazars supremacy.

In addition to these two branches, a third group of Pechenegs existed in this period: Constantine Porphyrogenitus and Ibn Fadlan mention that those who decided not to leave their homeland were incorporated into the Oghuz federation of Turkic tribes.

Originally, the Pechenegs had their dwelling on the river Atil (Volga), and likewise on the river Geïch, having common frontiers with the Chazars and the so-called Uzes. But fifty years ago, the so-called Uzes made common cause with the Chazars and joined battle with the Pechenegs and prevailed over them and expelled them from their country, which the so-called Uzes have occupied till this day. [...] At the time when the Pechenegs were expelled from their country, some of them of their own will and personal decision stayed behind there and united with the so-called Uzes, and even to this day they live among them, and wear such distinguishing marks as separate them off and betray their origin and how it came about that they were split off from their own folk: for their tunics are short, reaching to the knee, and their sleeves are cut off at the shoulder, whereby, you see, they indicate that they have been cut off from their own folk and those of their race.

— Constantine Porphyrogenitus: De Administrando Imperio

However, it is uncertain whether this group's formation is connected to the Pechenegs' first or second migration (as it is proposed by Pritsak and Golden, respectively). According to Mahmud al-Kashgari, one of the Üçok clans of the Oghuz Turks was still formed by Pechenegs in the 1060s.

=== Alliance with Byzantium ===
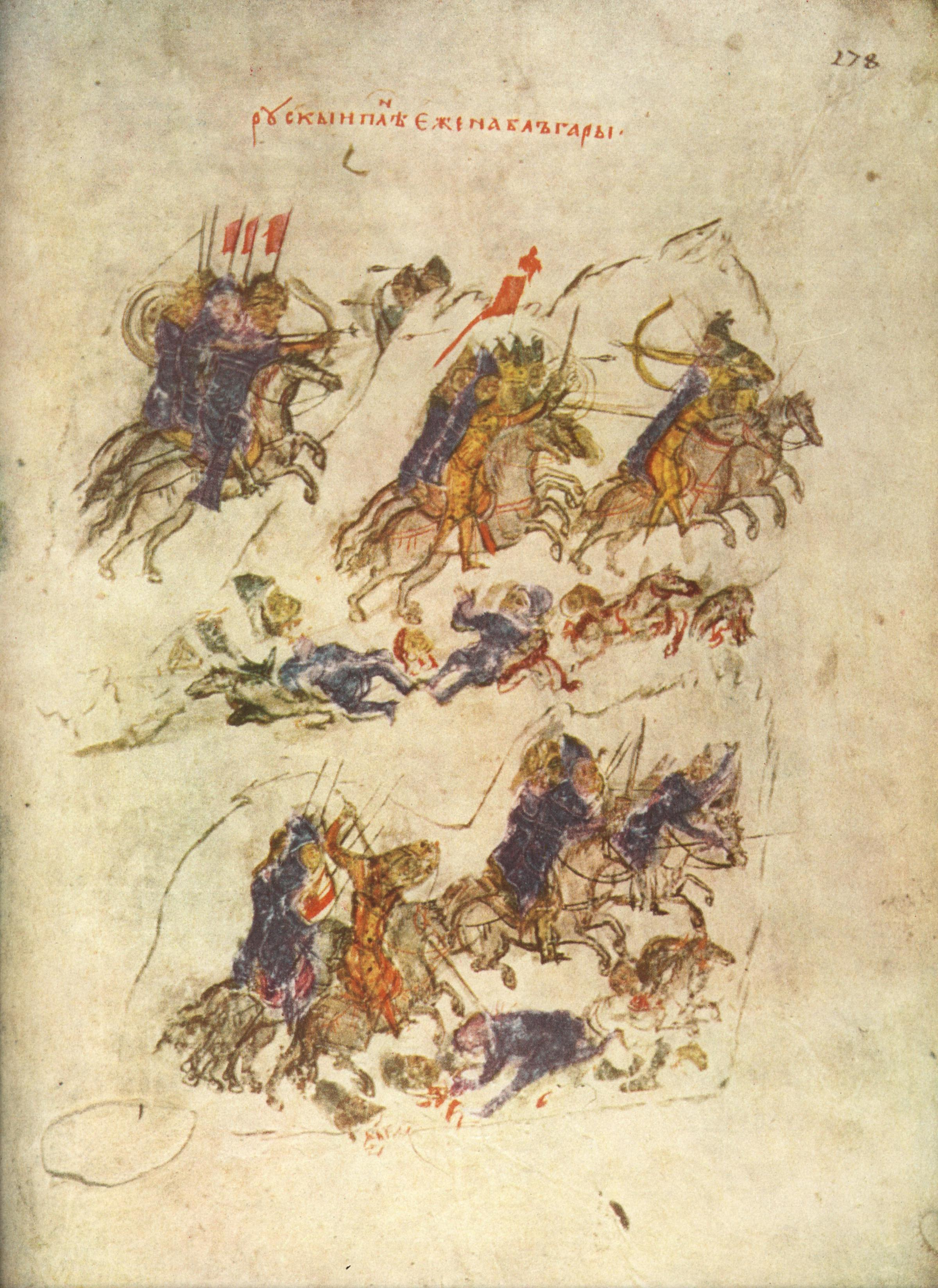
Sviatoslav enters Bulgaria with Pecheneg allies, from the Constantine Manasses Chronicle.

In the 9th century, the Byzantines allied with the Pechenegs, using them to fend off other, more dangerous, tribes such as Kievan Rus' and the Magyars (Hungarians).

The Uzes, another Turkic steppe people, eventually expelled the Pechenegs from their homeland; in the process, they also seized most of their livestock and other goods. An alliance of Oghuz, Kimeks, and Karluks was also pressing the Pechenegs, but another group, the Samanids, defeated that alliance. Driven further west by the Khazars and Cumans by 889, the Pechenegs in turn drove the Magyars west of the Dnieper River by 892.

Tsar Simeon I of Bulgaria employed the Pechenegs to help fend off the Magyars. The Pechenegs were so successful that they drove out the Magyars remaining in Etelköz and the Pontic steppes, forcing them westward in Battle of Southern Buh and making them leave Etelköz forever and settle in Pannonia where they later founded the Hungarian state.

=== Late history and decline ===
By the 9th and 10th centuries, Pechenegs controlled much of the steppes of southeast Europe and the Crimean Peninsula. Although an important factor in the region at the time, like most nomadic tribes, their concept of statecraft failed to go beyond random attacks on neighbours and spells as mercenaries for other powers.

In the 9th century, the Pechenegs began a period of wars against Kievan Rus'. For more than two centuries, they had launched raids into the lands of Rus', which sometimes escalated into full-scale wars (like the 920 war on the Pechenegs by Igor of Kiev, reported in the Primary Chronicle). The Pecheneg wars against Kievan Rus' caused the Slavs from Walachian territories to gradually migrate north of the Dniestr in the 10th and 11th centuries. Rus'/Pecheneg temporary military alliances also occurred however, as during the Byzantine campaign in 943 led by Igor. (Note: Ibn Haukal describes the Pechenegs as the long-standing allies of the Rus', whom they invariably accompanied during the 10th century Caspian expeditions.)

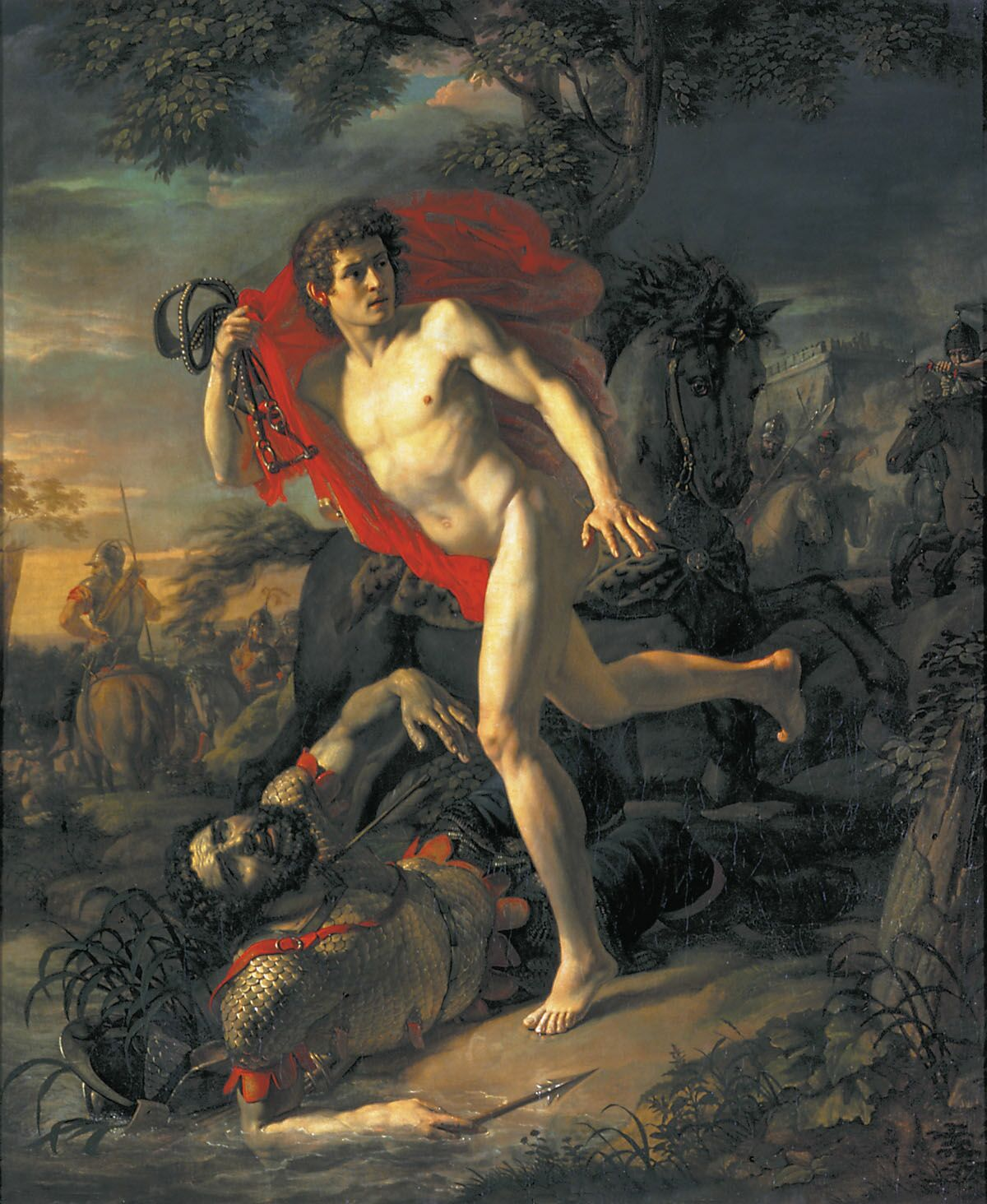
The heroic deed of the young Kyivite during the siege of Kyiv by the Pechenegs in 968. Andrey Ivanovich Ivanov.

In 968 the Pechenegs attacked and besieged Kiev; some joined the Prince of Kiev, Sviatoslav I, in his Byzantine campaign of 970–971, though eventually they ambushed and killed the Kievan prince in 972. According to the Primary Chronicle, the Pecheneg Khan Kurya made a chalice from Sviatoslav's skull, in accordance with the custom of steppe nomads. The fortunes of the Rus'-Pecheneg confrontation swung during the reign of Vladimir I of Kiev (990–995), who founded the town of Pereyaslav upon the site of his victory over the Pechenegs, (Note: The chronicler explains the town's name, derived from the Slavic word for "retake", was inspired by Vladimir "retaking" military glory from the Pechenegs.) followed by the defeat of the Pechenegs during the reign of Yaroslav I the Wise in 1036. Shortly thereafter, other nomadic peoples replaced the weakened Pechenegs in the Pontic steppe: the Cumans and the Torks. According to Mykhailo Hrushevsky (History of Ukraine-Ruthenia), after its defeat near Kiev, the Pecheneg Horde moved towards the Danube, crossed the river, and disappeared out of the Pontic steppes.

Pecheneg mercenaries served under the Byzantines at the Battle of Manzikert. After centuries of fighting involving all their neighbours—the Byzantine Empire, Bulgaria, Kievan Rus', Khazaria, and the Magyars—the Pechenegs were annihilated as an independent force in 1091 at the Battle of Levounion by a combined Byzantine and Cuman army under Byzantine Emperor Alexios I Komnenos. Alexios I recruited the defeated Pechenegs, whom he settled in the district of Moglena (today in Macedonia) into a tagma "of the Moglena Pechenegs". Attacked again in 1094 by the Cumans, many Pechenegs were slain or absorbed. The Byzantines defeated the Pechenegs again at the Battle of Beroia in 1122, on the territory of modern-day Bulgaria. With time, the Pechenegs south of the Danube lost their national identity and became fully assimilated, mostly with Romanians and Bulgarians. Significant communities settled in the Hungarian kingdom, around 150 villages.

In 1105 or 1106, Pecheneg troops were deployed to Italy in an unsuccessful effort to capture Otranto and prevent Bohemond's invasion of the Byzantine Balkans. Anna Komnene erroneously reports that Bohemond dragged Pecheneg prisoners in chains before Pope Paschal II to gain support for his invasion, although the respective itineraries of the two men clearly indicate that they did not meet on this occasion. According to the Byzantine historian John Kinnamos, the Pechenegs fought as mercenaries for the Byzantine Emperor Manuel I Komnenos in southern Italy against the Norman king of Sicily, William the Bad. A group of Pechenegs was present at the Battle of Andria in 1155.

The Pechenegs and contemporary Asian polities circa 1000 CE.

The Pechenegs as a group were last mentioned in 1168 as members of Turkic tribes known in the chronicles as the "Chorni Klobuky (Black Hats)". The Pecheneg population of Hungary was likely decimated by the Mongol invasion of Hungary, but names of Pecheneg origin continue to be reported in official documents. The title of "Comes Bissenorum" (Count of the Pechenegs) lasted for at least another 200 years.

In 15th-century Hungary, some people adopted the surname Besenyö (Hungarian for "Pecheneg"); they were most numerous in the county of Tolna. One of the earliest introductions of Islam into Eastern Europe came about through the work of an early 11th-century Muslim prisoner who was captured by the Byzantines. The Muslim prisoner was brought into the Besenyő territory of the Pechenegs, where he taught and converted individuals to Islam. In the late 12th century, Abu Hamid al-Gharnati referred to Hungarian Pechenegs – probably Muslims – living disguised as Christians. There is a village in southeast Serbia called Pečenjevce that was founded by Pechenegs. After the war with Byzantium, the remnants of the tribes found refuge in the area and settled there.

== Settlements bearing the name Pecheneg ==
- Búzásbesenyő, Romania
- Besenyszög, Hungary
- Besenyőd, Hungary
- Besenyőtelek, Hungary
- Besnyő, Hungary
- Bešenovački Prnjavor, Serbia
- Bešeňov, Slovakia
- Bešeňová, Slovakia
- Bešenovo, Serbia
- Beščeně, a part of Kunovice, Czech Republic
- Biçənək, Azerbaijan
- Ládbesenyő, Hungary
- Máriabesnyő a part of Gödöllő, Hungary
- Pechenihy, Ukraine
- Peceneaga, Romania
- Peceneaga (Danube), Romania
- Pecineaga, Romania (old name: Peçenek Gerencik)
- Pecineaga (river), Romania
- Peçenek, Turkey
- Peçenek, Turkey
- Peçenek, Turkey
- Peçenek, Turkey
- Peçenek, Turkey
- Pečenice, Slovakia
- Pečenjevce, Serbia
- Pečeneg Ilova, Bosnia and Herzegovina
- Pečeňady, Slovakia
- Pieczeniegi, Poland
- Pieczonogi, Świętokrzyskie Voivodeship, Poland
- Pieczonogi, Lesser Poland Voivodeship, Poland
- Pöttsching, Austria
- Szirmabesenyő, Hungary
- Pechenitsa, Bulgaria

== Leaders ==
- Kurya c. 970s (Note: While his rule's exact end cannot be dated, Kurya was no longer khan by 988.)
- Metiga c. 980s
- Kuchug c. 990s
- Kızıl Beg Western Anatolia c. 1184-(????)s

== Descendants of the Pechenegs ==
Some historians believe that the Pechenegs were the ancestors of the modern Karakalpaks. According to Askerbay Turganbayev, there is a scientific hypothesis suggesting that after their defeat in the 11th–12th centuries, some Pechenegs migrated to the Aral region, where they contributed to the ethnogenesis of the Karakalpaks. He notes similarities in traditions, nomadic lifestyles, and some linguistic elements between the Karakalpaks and earlier Turkic peoples, including the Pechenegs.

Public figure Olzhas Suleimenov suggested that the name "Pecheneg" derives from the word Pajanak ("in-law"), indicating kinship ties between Pecheneg khagans and Russian princes. This word has parallels in Turkic languages, including Karakalpak, where baja or boja also means "in-law."

The 14th-century Persian historian Rashid al-Din recorded that one of the Kipchak tribes was called "Kara-Borkli" ("Black Hats"), which may be linked to the ethnonym "Karakalpaks." Some scholars suggest that this tribe was among the remnants of the Pechenegs that assimilated into the Kipchak and later Karakalpak groups.

Archaeological studies in the deltas of the Amu Darya and Syr Darya rivers have uncovered traces of Saka-Massagetae tribes, which may have been the ancestors of the Karakalpaks. The consolidation of Pecheneg tribes in the southeastern Aral region in the 9th–11th centuries is believed to have played a role in Karakalpak ethnogenesis.

== See also ==
- Megleno-Romanians
- Taksony of Hungary
- Tonuzoba
- Pok (genus)
- Szolnok (genus)
- Vata (noble)
- Bána (genus)
- Ladislaus I Losonci
- Benedict, son of Samud
- Chorni Klobuky
- Sinka de Sinka
- Cumans
- Kangar union
- Kankalis
- Khazars
- Kipchaks
- Manav People
- Petržalka
- PKP Pecheneg, A Russian-made general-purpose machine gun named after the Turkic tribe
- Timeline of the Turkic peoples (500–1300)
- Karakalpaks
