= Wólka Oleśnicka =

- Hamlet of village
- Location within Poland
- Coordinates: 50°25′48″N 21°05′02″E
- Country: Poland
- Voivodeship: Świętokrzyskie
- County: Staszów
- Gmina: Oleśnica
- Sołectwo: Wólka Oleśnicka
- Elevation: 209.4 m (687 ft)
- Time zone: UTC+1 (CET)
  - Summer (DST): UTC+2 (CEST)
- Postal code: 28-220
- Area code: +48 41
- Car plates: TSZ

Wólka Oleśnicka [ˈvulka ɔlɛɕˈnit͡ska] is a hamlet of village in the administrative district of Gmina Oleśnica, within Staszów County, Świętokrzyskie Voivodeship, in south-central Poland. It lies approximately 3 km (2 mi) south-east of Oleśnica, 16 km (10 mi) south of Staszów, and 60 km (37 mi) south-east of the regional capital Kielce.
