= Kępie, Staszów County =

Kępie
- Village
- Location within Poland
- Coordinates: 50°27′25″N 21°02′05″E
- Country: Poland
- Voivodeship: Świętokrzyskie
- County: Staszów
- Gmina: Oleśnica
- Sołectwo: Kępie
- Elevation: 190 m (620 ft)

Population (31 December 2009 at Census)
  - Total: ▼196
- Time zone: UTC+1 (CET)
  - Summer (DST): UTC+2 (CEST)
- Postal code: 28-220
- Area code: +48 41
- Car plates: TSZ

Kępie [ˈkɛmpjɛ] is a village in the administrative district of Gmina Oleśnica, within Staszów County, Świętokrzyskie Voivodeship, in south-central Poland. It lies approximately 3 km (2 mi) west of Oleśnica, 15 km (9 mi) south-west of Staszów, and 56 km (35 mi) south-east of the regional capital Kielce.
