= Sufczyce =

- Village
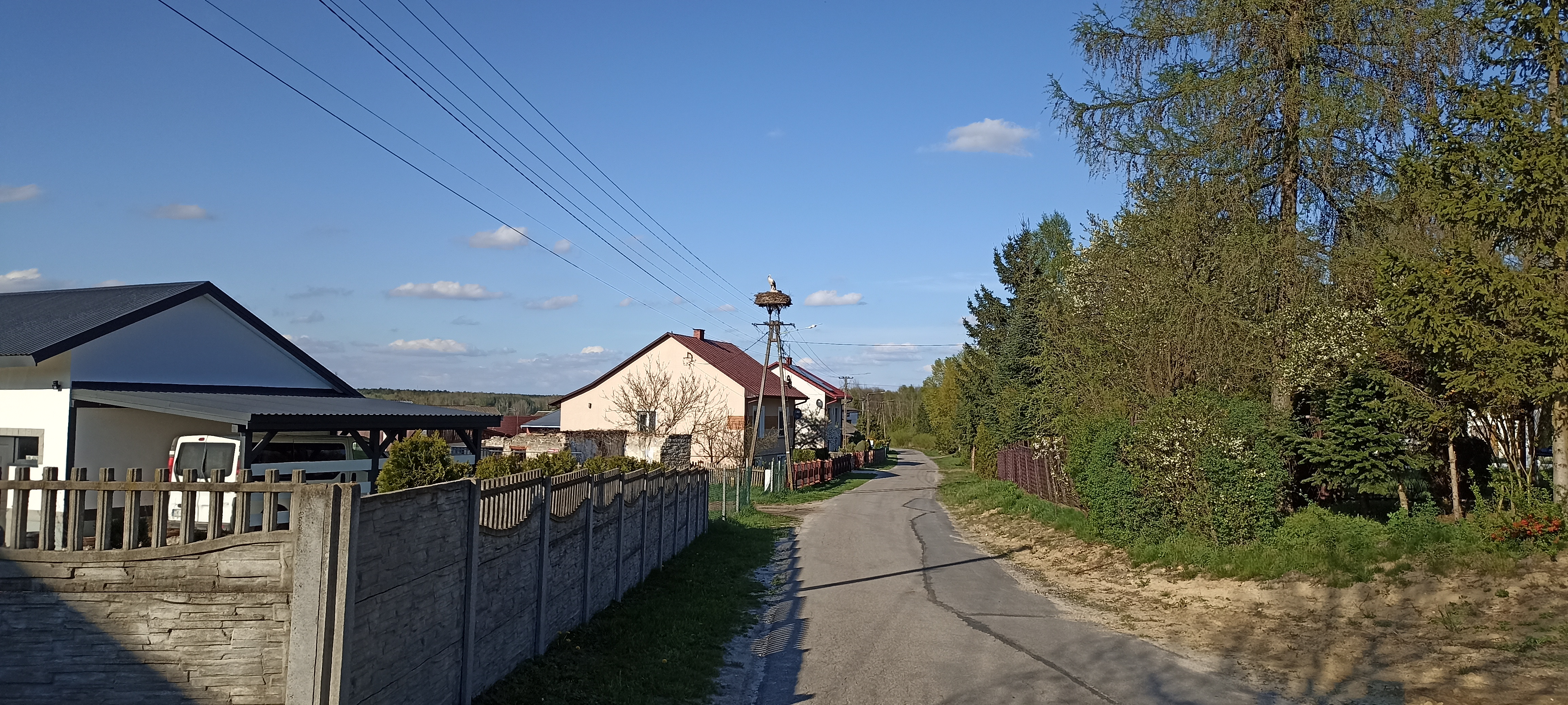

- Location within Poland
- Coordinates: 50°28′09″N 21°04′43″E
- Country: Poland
- Voivodeship: Świętokrzyskie
- County: Staszów
- Gmina: Oleśnica
- Sołectwo: Sufczyce
- Elevation: 182.6 m (599 ft)

Population (31 December 2009 at Census)
  - Total: ▲315
- Time zone: UTC+1 (CET)
  - Summer (DST): UTC+2 (CEST)
- Postal code: 28-220
- Area code: +48 41
- Car plates: TSZ

Sufczyce [sufˈt͡ʂɨt͡sɛ] is a village in the administrative district of Gmina Oleśnica, within Staszów County, Świętokrzyskie Voivodeship, in south-central Poland. It lies approximately 3 km (2 mi) north-east of Oleśnica, 12 km (7 mi) south-west of Staszów, and 57 km (35 mi) south-east of the regional capital Kielce.
