= Kurya (rural locality) =

Kurya (Russian: Курья) is the name of several rural localities in Russia:

- Kurya, Kuryinsky District, Altai Krai, a selo in Kuryinsky Selsoviet of Kuryinsky District of Altai Krai
- Kurya, Kytmanovsky District, Altai Krai, a selo in Kytmanovsky Selsoviet of Kytmanovsky District of Altai Krai
- Kurya, Arkhangelsk Oblast, a village in Moshinsky Selsoviet of Nyandomsky District of Arkhangelsk Oblast
- Kurya, Kemerovo Oblast, a settlement in Kuzedeyevskaya Rural Territory of Novokuznetsky District of Kemerovo Oblast
- Kurya, Sverdlovsk Oblast, a village in Shalinsky District of Sverdlovsk Oblast
- Kurya, Tyumen Oblast, a settlement in Suprinsky Rural Okrug of Vagaysky District of Tyumen Oblast
- Kurya, Udmurt Republic, a selo in Kuryinsky Selsoviet of Krasnogorsky District of the Udmurt Republic
- Kurya, Sheksninsky District, Vologda Oblast, a village in Churovsky Selsoviet of Sheksninsky District of Vologda Oblast
- Kurya, Sokolsky District, Vologda Oblast, a village in Vorobyevsky Selsoviet of Sokolsky District of Vologda Oblast
