= Pecheneg (disambiguation) =

The Pechenegs were a semi-nomadic Turkic tribe.

Pecheneg may also refer to:

- Pecheneg language
- Pecheneg machine gun, Russian machine gun
