= Podlesie, Gmina Oleśnica =

Podlesie
- Village
- Location within Poland
- Coordinates: 50°27′32″N 21°08′09″E
- Country: Poland
- Voivodeship: Świętokrzyskie
- County: Staszów
- Gmina: Oleśnica
- Sołectwo: Podlesie
- Elevation: 171.9 m (564 ft)

Population (31 December 2009 at Census)
  - Total: ▼196
- Time zone: UTC+1 (CET)
  - Summer (DST): UTC+2 (CEST)
- Postal code: 28-220
- Area code: +48 41
- Car plates: TSZ

Podlesie [pɔdˈlɛɕɛ] is a village in the administrative district of Gmina Oleśnica, within Staszów County, Świętokrzyskie Voivodeship, in south-central Poland. It lies approximately 5 km (3 mi) east of Oleśnica, 12 km (7 mi) south of Staszów, and 60 km (37 mi) south-east of the regional capital Kielce.
