= Brody, Staszów County =

Brody
- Village
- Location within Poland
- Coordinates: 50°28′48″N 21°06′42″E
- Country: Poland
- Voivodeship: Świętokrzyskie
- County: Staszów
- Gmina: Oleśnica
- Sołectwo: Brody
- Elevation: 176.4 m (579 ft)

Population (31 December 2009 at Census)
  - Total: ▲37
- Time zone: UTC+1 (CET)
  - Summer (DST): UTC+2 (CEST)
- Postal code: 28–220
- Area code: +48 41
- Car plates: TSZ

Brody [ˈbrɔdɨ] is a village in the administrative district of Gmina Oleśnica, within Staszów County, Świętokrzyskie Voivodeship, in south-central Poland. It lies approximately 5 km (3 mi) north-east of Oleśnica, 10 km (6 mi) south-west of Staszów, and 57 km (35 mi) south-east of the regional capital Kielce.
