= Strzelce, Świętokrzyskie Voivodeship =

Strzelce
- Village
- Location within Poland
- Coordinates: 50°28′28″N 21°02′02″E
- Country: Poland
- Voivodeship: Świętokrzyskie
- County: Staszów
- Gmina: Oleśnica
- Sołectwo: Strzelce
- Elevation: 182.8 m (600 ft)

Population (31 December 2009 at Census)
  - Total: ▼305
- Time zone: UTC+1 (CET)
  - Summer (DST): UTC+2 (CEST)
- Postal code: 28-220
- Area code: +48 41
- Car plates: TSZ

Strzelce [ˈstʂɛlt͡sɛ] is a village in the administrative district of Gmina Oleśnica, within Staszów County, Świętokrzyskie Voivodeship, in south-central Poland. It lies approximately 4 km (2 mi) north-west of Oleśnica, 14 km (9 mi) south-west of Staszów, and 55 km (34 mi) south-east of the regional capital Kielce.
