= Pieczonogi, Świętokrzyskie Voivodeship =

Pieczonogi
- Village
- Location within Poland
- Coordinates: 50°27′40″N 20°59′50″E
- Country: Poland
- Voivodeship: Świętokrzyskie
- County: Staszów
- Gmina: Oleśnica
- Sołectwo: Pieczonogi
- Elevation: 199.3 m (654 ft)

Population (31 December 2009 at Census)
  - Total: ▲433
- Time zone: UTC+1 (CET)
  - Summer (DST): UTC+2 (CEST)
- Postal code: 28-220
- Area code: +48 41
- Car plates: TSZ

Pieczonogi [pjɛt͡ʂɔˈnɔɡi] is a village in the administrative district of Gmina Oleśnica, within Staszów County, Świętokrzyskie Voivodeship, in south-central Poland. It lies approximately 5 km (3 mi) west of Oleśnica, 17 km (11 mi) south-west of Staszów, and 55 km (34 mi) south-east of the regional capital Kielce.

== Name ==
The toponym of the village comes from the Pechenegs, a semi-nomadic Turkic people who settled in the area during the time of the Piast dynasty. The Pechenegs in this area may have come as military settlers or may have simply been herders. They also lent their name to Pieczonogi, Lesser Poland Voivodeship and Pieczonóg-Gacki, a village near Szydłów.
