= Gmina Oleśnica =

Gmina Oleśnica may refer to either of the following rural administrative districts in Poland:

- Gmina Oleśnica, Lower Silesian Voivodeship
- Gmina Oleśnica, Świętokrzyskie Voivodeship
