= Bydłowa =

- Village
- Location within Poland
- Coordinates: 50°28′15″N 21°07′20″E
- Country: Poland
- Voivodeship: Świętokrzyskie
- County: Staszów
- Gmina: Oleśnica
- Sołectwo: Bydłowa
- Elevation: 173 m (568 ft)

Population (31 December 2009 at Census)
  - Total: ▼80
- Time zone: UTC+1 (CET)
  - Summer (DST): UTC+2 (CEST)
- Postal code: 28-220
- Area code: +48 41
- Car plates: TSZ

Bydłowa [bɨˈdwɔva] is a village in the administrative district of Gmina Oleśnica, within Staszów County, Świętokrzyskie Voivodeship, in south-central Poland. It lies approximately 5 km (3 mi) north-east of Oleśnica, 12 km (7 mi) south of Staszów, and 59 km (37 mi) south-east of the regional capital Kielce.
