= Borzymów =

- Village
- Location within Poland
- Coordinates: 50°26′35″N 21°06′31″E
- Country: Poland
- Voivodeship: Świętokrzyskie
- County: Staszów
- Gmina: Oleśnica
- Sołectwo: Borzymów
- Elevation: 194.2 m (637 ft)

Population (31 December 2009 at Census)
  - Total: ▼314
- Time zone: UTC+1 (CET)
  - Summer (DST): UTC+2 (CEST)
- Postal code: 28–220
- Area code: +48 41
- Car plates: TSZ

Borzymów [bɔˈʐɨmuf] is a village in the administrative district of Gmina Oleśnica, within Staszów County, Świętokrzyskie Voivodeship, in south-central Poland. It lies approximately 4 km (2 mi) east of Oleśnica, 14 km (9 mi) south of Staszów, and 60 km (37 mi) south-east of the regional capital Kielce.
