= Wojnów =

Wojnów may refer to the following places in Poland:

- Wojnów, Świętokrzyskie Voivodeship (south-central Poland)
- Wojnów, Masovian Voivodeship (east-central Poland)
