= Kangar union =

Turkic union founded in the 7th century

Coordinates: 48°N 65°E

Kangar Odagy
- 659–750
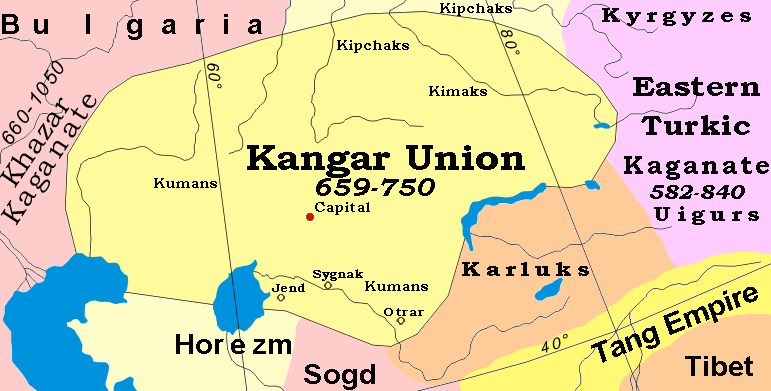
- The Kangar Union after the fall of the Western Turkic Khaganate, 659-750
- Capital: located in Ulutau mountains
- Common languages: Old Turkic
- Religion: Tengriism
- Khan (title)
- Legislature: Kurultai (Qurultay)
- History
  - Established: 659
  - Disestablished: 750
Preceded by
First Turkic Khaganate
Succeeded by
Western Turkic Khaganate
Kimak Khanate
Western Kangar State
Oghuz Yabgu State

Kangar union was a Turkic state in the territory of the entire modern Kazakhstan without Zhetysu. The ethnic name Kangar is an early medieval name for the Kangly/Uyghur] people, who are now part of the Uyghur, Kazakh, Uzbek, and Karakalpak nations. The capital of the Kangar union was located in the Ulytau mountains. The Pechenegs, three of whose tribes were known as Kangar (Greek: Καγγαρ), after being defeated by the Oghuz, Karluks, and Kimek-Kypchaks, attacked the Bulgars and joined with five other tribes & became the Pechenegs of Eastern Europe (890–990 CE).

== Etymology ==
The Kengeres (Old Turkic: 𐰚𐰭𐰼𐰾), mentioned in the Orkhon inscriptions, were possibly known in the Islamic world and in the west as Kangar, a collective name for three Pecheneg tribes (of eight). Byzantine emperor Constantine Porphyrogenitus stated that Kangar signified nobleness and bravery. Ukrainian historian Omeljan Pritsak suggested that Kangar originated from Tocharian A *kânk "stone" and Kengeres combined Kenger with the Iranian ethnonym As, supposedly from *ârs < *âvrs < *Aoruša (Greek: Αορσοι). However, Golden objected that *Aoruša would have yielded Ors/Urs and Pritsak's opinion on the Kengeres-Kangars' ethnonym and mixed Tocharian-Iranian origin remained "highly hypothetical". Other Orientalists, Marquart, Toltsov, Klyashtorny, attempted to connect the Kangar and Kengeres to the Qanglı, the eastern grouping of the Cuman-Kipchak confederation as well as the Indo-European Kangju in Chinese sources. Akhinžanov proposed that the Kipchaks simply assumed the name Qanglı (literally "wagon") after taking over the Kang region. András Róna-Tas (1996, 1999) proposes that the Pechenegs associated with their word kongor meaning "brown" (referring to their horses' coat color) with the ethnic name Kangar, which had been in existence in the Caucasus region as early as the 6th century CE before the Turkic peoples emerged; though he considers it a "case of an ethnic name established by means of a popular etymology". Nevertheless, all of these connections, if any, remain unclear.

== Independence ==
After the capture of Zhetysu by the Chinese, Kangars become independent from the Turkic Kaganate. The Syr Darya cities retained their autonomy. The Oguzes in the southern Kazakhstan, Kimaks in the Irtysh River valley, Cumans in Mugodjar, and Kypchaks in the northern Kazakhstan became the vassals of the Kangar union.

At the end of the 7th century the Syr Darya cities rebelled and formed an alliance with the Sogdiana. The revolt was successful, but the Muslim Arab armies attacked Sogdiana from the south. The revolt has waned, and Kangars consented to the continued autonomy of the Syr Darya cities.

== Fall of the Union ==
At the beginning of the 8th century the Oghuz confederation and the city of Tashkent seceded from the Kangar union. The Arabs continued raiding Sygnakh, Jend, and other rich Kangar cities. The Oguzes formed an alliance with the Kimaks and Karluks, and their joint assault defeated the Kangars, whose union dissolved. Three Kangar tribes and five allied Turkic tribes, under the collective name Pecheneg, later carved out a realm, which bordered both the Ouzes and the Khazars, in Eastern Europe.

== See also ==
- Pechenegs
- Kankalis (a people possibly related to the Kangars)
- Kangju
- Senior Juz
- History of the central steppe
- Turkic peoples
- Timeline of the Turkic peoples (500–1300)
