= Pieczonogi, Lesser Poland Voivodeship =

Pieczonogi
- Village
- Location within Poland
- Coordinates: 50°15′N 20°17′E
- Country: Poland
- Voivodeship: Lesser Poland
- County: Proszowice
- Gmina: Pałecznica

Pieczonogi [pjɛt͡ʂɔˈnɔɡi] is a village in the administrative district of Gmina Pałecznica, within Proszowice County, Lesser Poland Voivodeship, in southern Poland.

== Name ==
The toponym of the village comes from the Pechenegs, a semi-nomadic Turkic people who settled in the area during the time of the Piast dynasty. The Pechenegs in this area may have come as military settlers or may have simply been herders. They also lent their name to Pieczonogi, Świętokrzyskie Voivodeship and Pieczonóg-Gacki, a village near Szydłów.
