= Kang-chü =

Ancient nomadic people of Xiongnu origin

The Kang-chü, Kao-che, Gaoche or Kao-chü Ting-ling (chin. 高車, „high chariot/cart“) were an ancient Turkic people in East Asia in the 3rd century AD. Only known under the Chinese name Kao-che, they are usually equated with the ancient Dingling (丁零) and Kang and medieval Kipchaks. The semantic association of "carts" with Turkic nomads appears in the Gaoche ("high cart"), one of the Chinese names used for the Tiele(鐵勒) and later the Uyghurs. In Georgian and Latin sources Cumans, Kipchaks, and Qanglï are seen identical or at least “related”, while also perhaps being connected with the Kengeres/Kangar people and the toponym Qang.

== History ==
In the third century AD, the Dingling people formed part of the Southern Hsiung-Nu/Xiongnu(南匈奴). According to the Weilüe, an account from the years 239 to 265, a group of the Thing fled to the western steppes of Kazakhstan. During the Sixteen Kingdoms period, they established the state of Wei, which, however, is not identical to that of the Northern Wei Dynasty. At that time they were also called Gaoche for the first time. A section of the Gaoche is also said to have settled along the Orkhon River under the name of Bayeqi (拔也稽) until it was subdued by the Rouran in the early 5th century. Some of the Gaoche are said to have held high positions in the Rouran state.

The southern Gaoche, along with remnants of the Tabgach, repeatedly invaded the Rouran frontier regions. After a Rouran uprising against the Tabgach in 429, 1.5 million captive Gaoche were settled in the southern capital, Pingcheng. Six tribes and twelve clans are said to have belonged to the Gaoche among the Rouran in the 6th century.

In 524 there was an uprising against the Rouran that lasted until 526. As a result, many Gaoche moved south and assimilated into the local population. With this loss of population, the power of the Rouran declined over time. The Gaoche people in the region were followed by the Fufuluo (副伏羅), later the Chile (敕勒) or Tiele (鐵勒).

=== The king list ===
Family names and given name	Durations of reigns
Family name and given name
阿伏至羅 Āfúzhìluó	487–503
跋利延 Bálìyán	503–505
彌俄突 Mí'étú	505–516
伊匐 Yīfú	516–524
越居 Yuèjū	524–536
比造 Bǐzào	536–540
去賓 Qùbīn	540–541

== Origin ==
According to Chinese sources, the Gaoche (Kao-chü, chin. "high chariot/cart") were considered to be closest ethnically to the T'ieh-le (Tiele). Originally known as the Kao-chü Ting-ling (chin. "High Chariot Ting-ling"), the Kao-chü were apparently the last surviving branch of the Chidi (Chile). According to the History of Gaoche from the Chinese Chronicle Wei Shou (6th century), the origin of the Ting-ling/Dingling (丁零) and T'ieh-le (丁零 ) can be traced back to the Chidi (赤狄) or Red Di (赤狄), a people which settled in northern China during the spring and autumn periods. Their language is similar to the Hunnu/Hunyu with little difference (浑庾).
