= Kuchug =

Kuchug was a Pecheneg khan who ruled during the 990s CE. The Nikol'sk Chronicle relates that Kuchug converted to Christianity around the year 990 (most likely as a result of Vladimir the Great's Christianization). The Chronicle states that Kuchug "served Vladimir with a pure heart". The name of Kuchug means 'little, small' in Turkic. He was preceded as khan by Metiga, and his rule began no earlier than around 988 (but had certainly begun by 991; no exact date can be pinpointed for the beginning of his reign.
