= Metiga =

Metiga was a Pecheneg ruler who allied himself with Vladimir I of Kiev around the year 988 CE. Metiga assisted with the capture of Cherson by Vladimir, who converted to Christianity shortly after the town's fall to his forces. He was preceded as Pecheneg khan by Kurya, and succeeded by Kuchug; Metiga's rule was over by 991.

Also in 988, Metiga requested baptism from Vladimir.
