= Sinka de Sinka =

Noble family of Romanian origin

Genus (gens) Sinka de Sinka
- Country: Kingdom of Hungary, Principality of Transylvania, Habsburg Empire
- Earlier spellings: Synka, Sinka, Sinca, Șincai, Sinkai, Sinkay
- Origin: Șinca Valley (Făgăraș Land), Transylvania
- Founded: late 13th to 15th centuries
- Cadet branches: Multiple branches, including: Boila de Sinka, Bălan de Sinka, Bârsan de Sinka, Dumitru de Sinka, Ilie de Sinka, Oltean de Sinka, Șincai de Șinca, Sinka de Sinka, Stoia de Sinka, Strîmbu de Sinka și Vad

Sinka, also spelt Șinca (Romanian pronunciation: [ˈʃiŋka]), was a noble (boyar) kindred of Romanian origin, attested from the 15th century, in southern Transylvania, in Șinca Valley, in the historic region of Țara Făgărașului. Over the past five centuries, members of this kindred distinguished themselves in politics, administration, the military, culture, ecclesiastical affairs, and diplomacy.

== Historical background ==
The Sinka boyars were part of the military elite, known in the southern Transylvanian context as the "old and good boyars" (Romanian: boieri vechi și buni), first mentioned in historical records during the time when the Wallachian princes (voivodes) ruled Țara Făgărașului as dukes (from the 14th to the 15th centuries). This military noble class is the equivalent of the Western category of the nobles of the sword (as opposed to the later nobles of the robe, which emerged primarily through the acquisition of venal offices or administrative service).

The rise of this Romanian military elite from Țara Făgărașului can be linked with the rights granted to the population living in that area by Ladislaus IV, the King of Hungary and Croatia (1272 to 1290), to ensure the defence of the southern borders from the Golden Horde's attacks. The territory was known to be inhabited in the 13th century by the Pechenegs and the Vlachs, with the name Făgăraș itself being asserted to have a Turkic etymology.

The Sinka kindred owned properties in Șinca Valley ab antiquo, donated by Wallachian princes to the Făgăraș boyars since the 14th century as part of a feudal system. The division into multiple branches between the 15th and 16th centuries was enforced by a system of joint ownership know in Romanian as devălmășie. Although the fragmentation of the Șinca estate together with the broader political changes caused the impoverishment of most lineages, whilst their noble status was consistently reaffirmed by the rulers of Transylvania from the 16th to the 18th centuries, resulting in the preservation of some limited privileges and a distinct social status.

== Heraldry ==
The heraldic symbolism of the coat of arms of Sinka boyars, dating likely from the late 16th century, aligns closely with the martial heritage of this kindred. Heraldic lion was granted for courage, strength, valour, and authority, with its dynamic, upright posture emphasising military readiness and leadership. The curved sword, characteristic of Eastern European armoury, denotes martial prowess and defence of the homeland, reflecting Transylvania's military traditions. The azure field conveys loyalty, truth, and steadfastness, silver (argent) symbolises purity and peace, and gold (or), inferred for the coronet, represents nobility, generosity, and grandeur.

== Branches ==
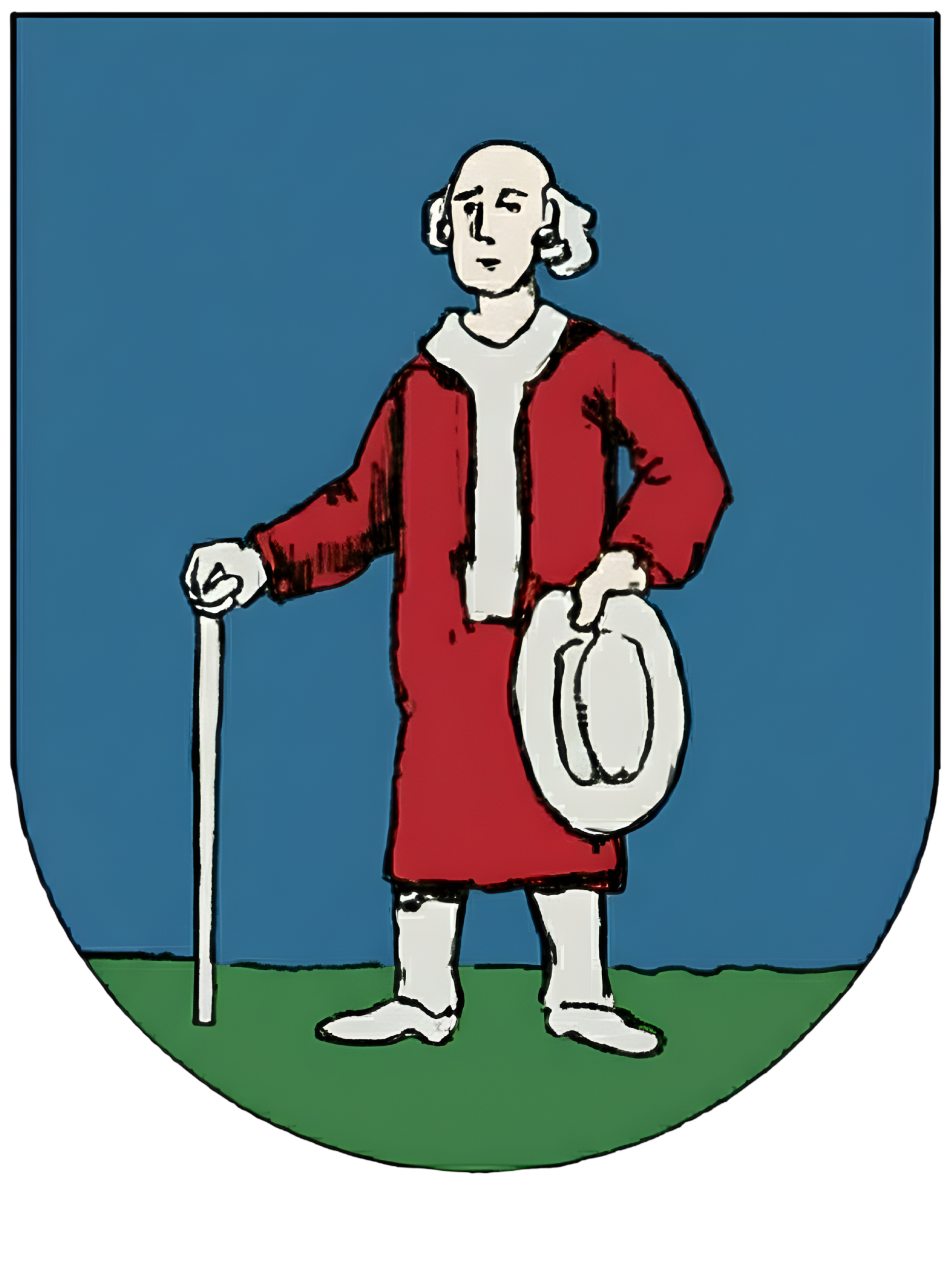
Fig.1 Personal arms granted in 1685 to Andreas Sinka by Michael I Apafi, the Prince of Transylvania

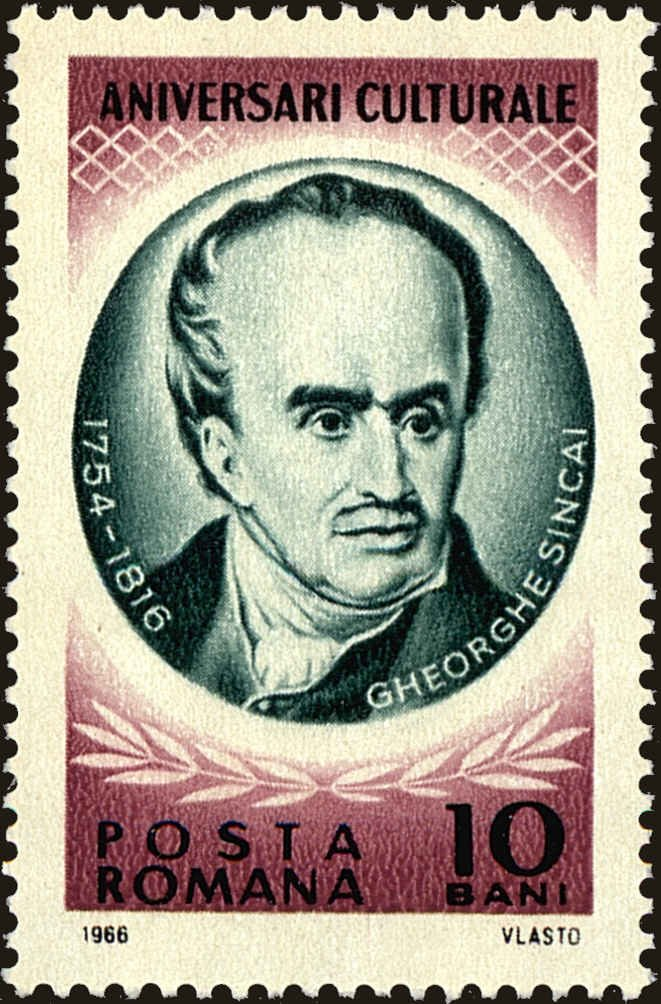
Fig. 2 Gheorghe Șincai (1754-1816)

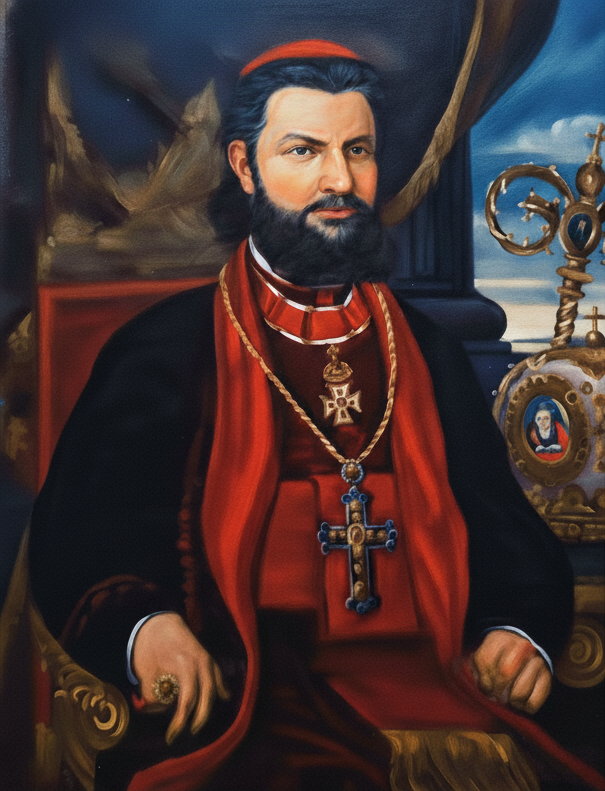
Fig. 3 Greek-Catholic Bishop Ioan Olteanu (1839-1877)

One of the oldest known members of this kin was the boyar Solomon Boila, who was born around the mid-15th century and established the Boila de Sinka branch, reconfirmed in their rights at the end of the 16th century.

The other branches from Făgăraș Land, including Bârsan de Sinka, Bălan de Sinka and Stoia de Sinka, continued to maintain their properties in Șinca Veche in the 17th and 18th centuries, where they were reconfirmed in their rights, first in 1633, then in 1657 by Zsuzsanna Lorántffy, the Princess consort of Transylvania, and in 1689 by Michael Apafi, the Prince of Transylvania. After the formation of the Transylvanian Military Frontier (German: Siebenbürgische Militärgrenze) by the Habsburgs in 1762, some of their descendants converted to Greek-Catholicism and became part of the 11th Company of the 1st Romanian Border Guards Regiment until its dissolution in 1851.

Among the descendants of Sinka boyars was also identified the Oltean de Sinka lineage, whose ancestor, Oltean de Sinka, served as the assessor of the boyar seat of Făgăraș (1511). Other members of this lineage include count Ioan Olteanu (1839-1877) (Fig. 3) - bishop of Lugoj (1870-1873), bishop of Oradea (1873-1875), ennobled by the Pope as Roman count and decorated as Commander of the Imperial Austrian Order of Franz Joseph, who is buried in the St. Nicholas Cathedral, Oradea. Ladislau Oltean, district-level official (praetor) in Hunyad County (1863) and Vasile Oltean, lawyer in Blaj.

The lineage Dumitru de Sinka was founded in the 16th century, with Aldea Dumitru de Sinka, the son of the boyar Stan Solomon de Sinka, a supporter of Mihnea I Basarab, the Voivode of Wallachia, born in the late 15th century. Their privileges were confirmed by Ștefan Mailat, the Voivode of Transylvania, in 1534, and later, reconfirmed by Maria Christina of Austria, the Princess of Transylvania, in 1598. However, in the context of the changing economic and political landscape in the first half of the 17th century, the lineage of the Dumitru de Sinka branch abandoned its remaining estates in Făgăraș Land and sought refuge in the nearby Saxon Lands (Latin: Fundus Regius). There, multiple lineages developed successively in the villages of Șona, Ticușu Nou, and later Homorod, all part of the former Rupea Seat (German: Repser Stuhl) - an administrative unit that existed from the 14th to the 19th century in southern Transylvania, now part of Brașov County. This cadet branch that settled in Rupea Seat on the Saxon Lands lost their noble privileges and renounced the use of the geographic particle de Sinka and lived as free tenants, continuing to practice the Orthodox faith of their ancestors.

Another branch of the Sinka boyars includes the Strîmbu branch, which was formed by the 16th century, and embraced the Greek-Catholic faith in the 18th century. Some members of this branch became priests, while others, like Ștefan Strîmbu Sinkay literatus, a soldier who became a border officer at Turnu-Roșu castle (ca.1729) at the onset of the Habsburg rule. However, the most prominent member of this line was Ștefan's descendant, Gheorghe Șincai de Șinca (1754–1816), (Fig. 2) historian, philologist, translator and poet, and a leading figure of the Transylvanian School during the Enlightenment, who co-authored the first grammar of the Romanian language (Elementa linguae daco-romanae sive valachicae, 1780). Two high schools in Romania, one in Baia Mare and one in Bucharest and the Romanian Academy’s research institute for Social Sciences and Humanities in Târgu-Mureș, are named in his honour. In addition to the numerous streets named in his honour throughout Romania, monuments depicting the scholar can be found in Șincai (MS), Blaj (AB), Zalău (SJ), Cluj-Napoca (CJ), Baia Mare (MM) and Bucharest.

A collateral branch converted to Roman Catholicism and entered the ranks of the Hungarian nobility as early as the 17th century, losing their Romanian cultural identity, while maintaining the geographic particle de Sinka or simply Sinka or Sinkai. Through their integration into the province's administrative elite (as illustrated by the coat of arms granted to this branch in 1685, Fig. 1), they managed to expand their estate during the late 17th and 18th centuries, relocating their seat to Hunyad County. Members of this branch held several regional offices, including Deputy Lieutenant (Hungarian: Alszolgabíró), Judge (German: Stuhlrichter), and Councillor at the Transylvanian Gubernium (Hungarian: Főkormányszéki ülnök).

== Notable Members ==
- Solomon Boila de Sinka - born mid-15th century, boyar, the oldest named member of the Sinka kindred.
- Stan Solomon de Sinka - born late 15th century, boyar, supporter of Mihnea I Basarab of Wallachia.
- Oltean de Sinka - c.1511, assessor of the boyar seat of Făgăraș.
- Krisztina de Sinka - c.1671, noble, wife of the baron Péter Nopcsa of Hunyad County.
- Andreas Sinka - c.1685, noble, constable in Deva, Hunyad County.
- Mihály de Sinka - c.1715, noble, deputy judge (alszolgabíró) of Hunyad County.
- László de Sinka - early 1700s, noble, landowner of Pojána and Vályajep estates.
- Manea Strîmbu - b. before 1702-d. after 1748, (also spelt Maniu), minor noble (boyar), likely a local Orthodox priest in Șinca; militant during the 1720s against the adoption of Greek-Catholicism in southern Transylvania, became a monk at Râmnic in Wallachia and later established a monastery in Șinca on his estate.
- Ștefan Strîmbu Sinkay - c.1729, soldier and border officer at Turnu-Roșu castle.
- Ioan Șincai - minor noble, was in the service of the Greek-Catholic Bishop Ioan Giurgiu Patachi (1680-1727), lived in Șamșond village (later renamed Șincai), father of the Transylvanian Romanian scholar Gheorghe Șincai, buried in Șinca.
- János, György and András Sinkai - c.1791, Transylvanian nobles, petitioned in the Diet towards the inheritance of their Persány estates in Făgăraș Land.
- Ioan Șincai - minor noble, officer, captain in the 2nd Wallachian Border Regiment (Ger: 2. Walachen Grenzinfanterieregiment) from Năsăud, died in 1796/7 in Lorch am Rhein, near Mainz (Germany), during the Rhine Campaign, during the War of the First Coalition between the French Republic and the Habsburg Monarchy.
- Gheorghe Șincai - 1754-1816, historian, philologist, librarian, translator, poet, and leading figure of the Transylvanian School, studied at the University of Cluj (Latin: Universitas Claudiopolitana), at the St.Barbara College (Lat: Barbareum) in Vienna and at the Pontificio Collegio Urbano de Propaganda Fide (nowadays Pontifical Urban University) where he befriended the Roman Cardinal Stefano Borgia (1731-1804).
- Sándor Sinkai - d.1861, noble, councilor at the Gubernium (fkormányszéki ülnök).
- Ladislau Oltean - 1863, district-level administrator, praetor in Hunyad County.
- Ioan Olteanu - 1839-1877, cleric, studied in Vienna, Greek-Catholic Bishop of Lugoj (1870-1873) and Bishop of Oradea (1873-1875), Bishop-Assistant at the Pontifical Throne, was ennobled by the papacy as a Roman count of the Holy See and was awarded the Imperial Austrian Order of Franz Joseph.
- Vasile Oltean - late 19th century, lawyer in Blaj.

== Related pages ==
- History of Transylvania
- Kingdom of Hungary
- Boyars of Făgăraș
- Romanians
- Vlachs
- Pechenegs
- Cumans
- Boyars
- Uradel
- Knez (Vlach leader)
- Vlach Law

== Bibliography ==
- Boamfă, Ionel and Alexandru Ungureanu. "Considerations regarding the meaning of toponym Făgăraș," Lucrările Seminarului Geografic Dimitrie Cantemir Vol. 49, Issue 1, October 2021.
- Bogdan, Gheorghe. Memory, Identity, Typology: An Interdisciplinary Reconstruction of Vlach Ethnohistory, Master of Arts Thesis, University of Northern British Columbia (2011).
- Caramelea, Vasile V. Tipuri de composesorate ale foștilor boieri și grăniceri din Țara Oltului. Sistemul juridic consuetudinar genealogic (Câmpulung-Muscel, 1945).
- Dragne, Aurel. "Église et société au XVIIIᵉ siècle. La situation des prêtres chrétiens roumains du Pays de Făgăraș," Acta Terrae Fogarasiensis, 5 (2016): 53-88.
- Faraon, Gheorghe. "Aspecte privind istoria Țării Făgărașului. Boieri din Vad în scaunele asesoriale de judecată," Acta Terrae Fogarasiensis, 5 (2016): 13-22.
- Faraon, Gheorghe and Irina Faron. "Aspecte privind istoria Țării Făgărașului. Ofițeri și soldați din localitatea Vad, înscriși în regimentele românești grănicerești (1766–1851)," Acta Terrae Fogarasiensis, 5 (2016): 307-316.
- Madgearu, Alexandru. "The Mongol domination and the detachment of the Romanians of Walachia from the domination of the Hungarian Kingdom," De Medio Aevo 12, 2018.
- Nagy, Iván. Magyarország családai czímerekkel és nemzékrendi táblákkal: Tizedik-kötet (Pest: Ráth Mór, 1863).
- Papiu-Ilarian, Alexandru. Vieti'a operele si ideele lui Georgiu Sincai din Sinca (Bucuresci: Tipografia Naţionale, 1869).
- Pop, Ioan-Aurel. "Genealogie și istorie: o familie boierească din Țara Făgărașului în secolele XV-XVII," Arhiva genealogică, 1994, I (VI), no. 1-2.
- Puşcariu, Ioan. Date istorice privitoare la familile nobile române, II (Sibiiu: Tipariulu tipografiei arhidiecesane,1895).
- Puşcariu, Ioan. Fragmente istorice. Despre boierii din Ţara Făgăraşului, vol. III (Tipariul tipografiei archidiecesane: Sibiu, 1904).
- Reichenauer von Reichenau, Constantin, Géza Csergheő, Oszkár von Bárczay. Der Adel von Siebenbürgen (Nürnberg: Bauer & Raspe, 1898).
- Vizauer, Victor. "The Statutes of the Transylvanian Romanians from Făgăraș (1508). A Historical Perspective and a Comparison with the Transylvanian Saxon and Szekler Customary Laws," Balcanica Posnaniensia. Acta et studia, XXXI, (2024).
