= Wojnów, Świętokrzyskie Voivodeship =

Wojnów
- Village
- Location within Poland
- Coordinates: 50°27′19″N 21°05′19″E
- Country: Poland
- Voivodeship: Świętokrzyskie
- County: Staszów
- Gmina: Oleśnica
- Sołectwo: Wojnów
- Elevation: 180.4 m (592 ft)

Population (31 December 2009 at Census)
  - Total: ▲250
- Time zone: UTC+1 (CET)
  - Summer (DST): UTC+2 (CEST)
- Postal code: 28-220
- Area code: +48 41
- Car plates: TSZ

Wojnów [ˈvɔi̯nuf] is a village in the administrative district of Gmina Oleśnica, within Staszów County, Świętokrzyskie Voivodeship, in south-central Poland. It lies approximately 1 km (1 mi) north-east of Oleśnica, 14 km (9 mi) south-west of Staszów, and 58 km (36 mi) south-east of the regional capital Kielce.
