= Boyars of Fogaras =

Group of Romanian nobles in the medieval Kingdom of Hungary

The boyars of Fogaras (now Făgăraș in Romania) were a group of Vlach (or Romanian) conditional nobles in the medieval Kingdom of Hungary and the Principality (and Grand Principality) of Transylvania.

== Background ==
The earliest royal charter which mentioned the Vlachs' presence in southern Transylvania was issued in the early 13th century. The document recorded that Andrew II of Hungary had deprived the local Vlachs from a small territory between the rivers Olt, Arpaș (Árpás) and Cârțișoara and granted it to the newly established Cistercian Kerc Abbey. A hoard of hacksilver discovered at Cârțișoara, which contained a Byzantine coin from the first half of the 12th century, also confirm the Vlachs' presence in the region. The earliest record about a permanent Vlach settlement in the region – Kerch Olachorum (or "Vlachs' Kerc" at present-day Cârțișoara) – was made in 1332. Decades later, the first place names of Romanian origin were also recorded: Cuciulata in 1372 and Mândra in 1401.

Louis I of Hungary forced Vladislav I of Wallachia to accept his suzerainty in 1366. To secure Vladislav's loyalty, the king also granted him landed property in southern Transylvania, including the district of Fogaras (around present-day Făgăraș in Romania). Six years later, Vladislav donated estates to Wallachian boyars (or noblemen) in the district. Most of Vladislav's successors who also held Fogaras – Mircea the Elder, Vlad the Impaler, Radu the Fair and Basarab Laiotă – regularly granted estates to their boyars or awarded the heads of the local communities with the title boyar.

== History ==
In 1372 Vladislav I of Wallachia gave to the magistrate Ladislau de Dopca, his relative, five estates in the district of Fogaras. Mircea I of Wallachia gives the village of Szkore to Stanciul the hegumen and his brother Călin, and in 1400 he strengthens to his boyars Micul and Stoia the dominion over half of the village of Mondra. The boyars Ion, Borcea and Călin had during Mircea's reign three villages with the mountains that belonged to them, and the boyar Costea had two and a half villages.

Through a document from June 10, 1417, Mircea I of Wallachia strengthened Ion, Borcea and Calian,

"To the boyar of my lordship so that their village may be Árpásthou and Vad [...], of estate and inheritance and of all the services and gifts and tithes, as many as they will find in the whole land of the country [...] lordship my."

We mention that the Borcea family name still exists in Vad, and the Calian family name is found in the neighboring village, Sinke.

In 1437 the boyar Stanciu and his brother Roman receive from Vlad II Dracul the village of Voivodeni/Vajdafalva. The increase of the boyar from Fogaras was observed in the richer donations, so in 1473 the family of the master Stoica Naneș obtained from Radu cel Frumos more than 13 villages and 3 mountains.

Towards the end of the 15th century and the beginning of the following century, the history of Fogaras district experienced a more turbulent period. In 1508 a boyar revolt tried unsuccessfully to bring the country under the rule of the Muntenian voivode Mihnea cel Rău.

The 1640 conscription counts 248 boyars in the Fogaras domain. In 1648, 87 boyars appeared in the fields of Porumbáktanya and Kwmana (Komána/Comăna).

Zsuzsanna Lorántffy (1600-1660), the wife of the prince of Transylvania George I Rákóczi, the mistress of the Făgăraș Citadel, issued 21 boyar diplomas, in some cases confirming "their old boyar rights". Residents of Bucsum, Also Uczya (Alsóucsa/Ucea de Sus), Also Venechia (Veneția de Jos), Dragos (Drăguș), Sinke, Hirszen (Hârseni) received such diplomas.

In the conscription from 1720 to 1721 in 53 villages belonging to the Făgăraș, Porumbac and Comăna domains, 725 boyars have appeared.

== See also ==
- Sinka de Sinka

== Sources ==
- Costea, Ionuț (2009). "Social Structures". In Pop, Ioan-Aurel; Nägler, Thomas; Magyari, András (eds.). The History of Transylvania, Volume II (From 1541 to 1711). Romanian Academy, Center for Transylvanian Studies. pp. 199–225. ISBN 978-973-7784-04-9.
- Curta, Florin (2006). Southeastern Europe in the Middle Ages, 500–1250. Cambridge University Press. ISBN 978-0-521-89452-4.
- Makkai, László (1994). "The Emergence of the Estates (1172–1526)". In Köpeczi, Béla; Barta, Gábor; Bóna, István; Makkai, László; Szász, Zoltán; Borus, Judit (eds.). History of Transylvania. Akadémiai Kiadó. pp. 178–243. ISBN 963-05-6703-2.
- Pop, Ioan-Aurel (2005). "Romanians in the 14th–16th Centuries: From the "Christian Republic" to the "Restoration of Dacia"". In Pop, Ioan-Aurel; Bolovan, Ioan (eds.). History of Romania: Compendium. Romanian Cultural Institute (Center for Transylvanian Studies). pp. 209–314. ISBN 978-973-7784-12-4.
