= Pečenjevce =

Pečenjevce Печењевце
- Village
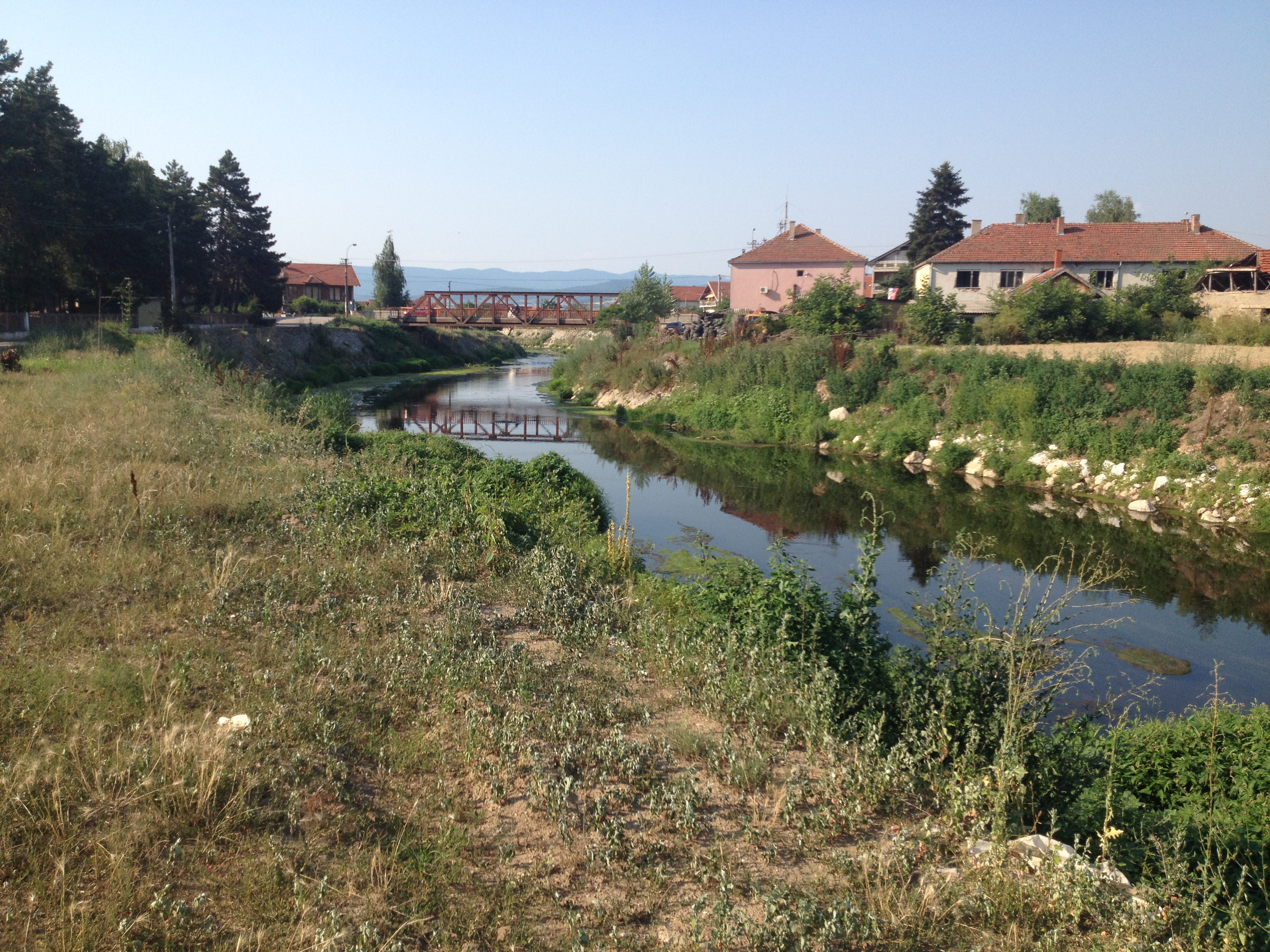
- Jablanica river in Pečenjevce.

- Location within Serbia
- Coordinates: 43°06′N 21°55′E
- Country: Serbia
- Region: Southern and Eastern Serbia
- District: Jablanica District
- Municipality: Leskovac

Population (2022)
  - Total: 1,203
- Time zone: UTC+1 (CET)
  - Summer (DST): UTC+2 (CEST)
- Postal code: 16251
- Area code: +381 (16)
- Vehicle registration: LE

Pečenjevce (Serbian Cyrillic: Печењевце) is a settlement in south-east Serbia (Jablanica District), located at municipality Leskovac. The settlement is a native place of the famous Serbian folk singer Toma Zdravković. The origin of the town name is reported to be from Turkic Pechenegs who settled in the area during the Middle Ages.
