= Gmina Oleśnica, Świętokrzyskie Voivodeship =

Gmina Oleśnica Oleśnica Commune
- Gmina
- Coat of arms

- Coordinates (Oleśnica): 50°27′27.34″N 21°03′43.74″E
- Country: Poland
- Voivodeship: Świętokrzyskie
- County: Staszów
- Seat: Oleśnica

Area (through the years 2006–2010)
  - Total: 53.38 km^{2} (20.61 sq mi)

Population (31 December 2010 at Census)
  - Total: 3,891
  - Density: 72.89/km^{2} (188.8/sq mi)
- Time zone: UTC+1 (CET)
  - Summer (DST): UTC+2 (CEST)
- Postal code: 28–220
- Area code: +48 41
- Car plates: TSZ
- Website: http://www.olesnica.realnet.pl/

Gmina Oleśnica is a rural gmina (administrative district) in Staszów County, Świętokrzyskie Voivodeship, in south-central Poland. Its seat is the village of Oleśnica, which lies approximately 15 kilometres (9 mi) south-west of Staszów and 58 km (36 mi) south-east of the regional capital Kielce.

The gmina covers an area of 53.38 square kilometres (20.6 sq mi), and as of 2010 its total population is ▼3,891.

== Demography ==
According to the 2011 Poland census, there were 3,891 people residing in Oleśnica Commune, of whom 49.7% were male and 50.3% were female. In the commune, the population was spread out, with 19.3% under the age of 18, 38.9% from 18 to 44, 22.5% from 45 to 64, and 19.3% who were 65 years of age or older.

Table 1. Population level of commune in 2010 – by age group
SPECIFICATION					Measure unit	POPULATION (by age group in 2010)																		
SPECIFICATION					Measure unit	TOTAL	0–4	5–9	10–14	15–19	20–24	25–29	30–34	35–39	40–44	45–49	50–54	55–59	60–64	65–69	70–74	75–79	80–84	85 +
I.	TOTAL				person	3891	173	176	231	274	324	354	214	257	262	271	277	229	204	130	160	149	111	95
I.	—	of which in			%	100	4.4	4.5	5.9	7.0	8.3	9.1	5.5	6.6	6.7	7.0	7.1	5.9	5.2	3.3	4.1	3.8	2.9	2.4
I.	1.	BY SEX																						
I.	1.	A.	Males		person	1932	82	98	126	149	177	173	113	130	136	142	158	122	99	47	62	52	39	27
I.	1.	A.	—	of which in	%	49.7	2.1	2.5	3.2	3.8	4.5	4.4	2.9	3.3	3.5	3.6	4.1	3.1	2.5	1.2	1.6	1.3	1.0	0.7
I.	1.	B.	Females		person	1959	91	78	105	125	147	181	101	127	126	129	119	107	105	83	98	97	72	68
I.	1.	B.	—	of which in	%	50.3	2.3	2.0	2.7	3.2	3.8	4.7	2.6	3.3	3.2	3.3	3.1	2.7	2.7	2.1	2.5	2.5	1.9	1.7

Figure 1. Population pyramid of commune in 2010 – by age group and sex

Table 2. Population level of commune in 2010 – by sex
SPECIFICATION						Measure unit	POPULATION (by sex in 2010)		
SPECIFICATION						Measure unit	TOTAL	Males	Females
I.	TOTAL					person	3,891	1,932	1,959
I.	—	of which in				%	100	49.7	50.3
I.	1.	BY AGE GROUP							
I.	1.	A.	At pre-working age			person	750	395	355
I.	1.	A.	—	of which in		%	19.3	10.2	9.1
I.	1.	B.	At working age. grand total			person	2,391	1,310	1,081
I.	1.	B.	—	of which in		%	61.4	33.7	27.8
I.	1.	B.	a.	at mobile working age		person	1,515	789	726
I.	1.	B.	a.	—	of which in | %	38.9	20.3	18.7	
I.	1.	B.	b.	at non-mobile working age		person	876	521	355
I.	1.	B.	b.	—	of which in | %	22.5	13.4	9.1	
I.	1.	C.	At post-working age			person	750	227	523
I.	1.	C.	—	of which in		%	19.3	5.8	13.4

== Villages ==
Gmina Oleśnica contains the villages and settlements of Borzymów, Brody, Bydłowa, Kępie, Oleśnica, Pieczonogi, Podlesie, Strzelce, Sufczyce, Wojnów and Wólka Oleśnicka.

== Neighbouring gminas ==
Gmina Oleśnica is bordered by the gminas of Łubnice, Pacanów, Rytwiany, Stopnica and Tuczępy.
