= Kurya, Sokolsky District, Vologda Oblast =

Kurya Курья
- Village
- Location within Vologda Oblast Location within Russia
- Coordinates: 59°36′N 40°55′E
- Country: Russia
- Region: Vologda Oblast
- District: Sokolsky District
- Time zone: UTC+3:00

Kurya (Russian: Курья) is a rural locality (a village) in Vorobyovskoye Rural Settlement, Sokolsky District, Vologda Oblast, Russia. The population was 6 in 2002.

== Geography ==
Kurya is located 68 kilometres (42 mi) northeast of Sokol, the district's administrative centre, by road. Rogozkino is the nearest rural locality.
