= Kangly =

Extinct Turkic people

The Kangly (康曷利; pinyin: Kānghélì; Middle Chinese (ZS): /kʰɑŋ-ɦɑt̚-liɪ^{H}/ or 康里 pinyin: Kānglĭ < MC-ZS: /kʰɑŋ-lɨ^{X}/;Karakhanid: قنكلى, romanized: Kaɣnï or قنكلى romanised: Kaŋlï, also spelled Qaŋlï, Qanglı, Kanly, Kangly, Qangli, Kangli or Kankali) were a Turkic people of Eurasia who were active from the Tang dynasty up to the Mongol Empire and Yuan dynasty.

== Origins ==
Their exact origin remains uncertain. Erkoç (2023) proposes several possible origins — they:

- may be related to the Kipchaks or to the Pechenegs
- may have been a branch of the Kök Turks who were conquered by the Tang dynasty of China
- may have originated from Tiele tribes (*Tägräk).

== Historical references ==
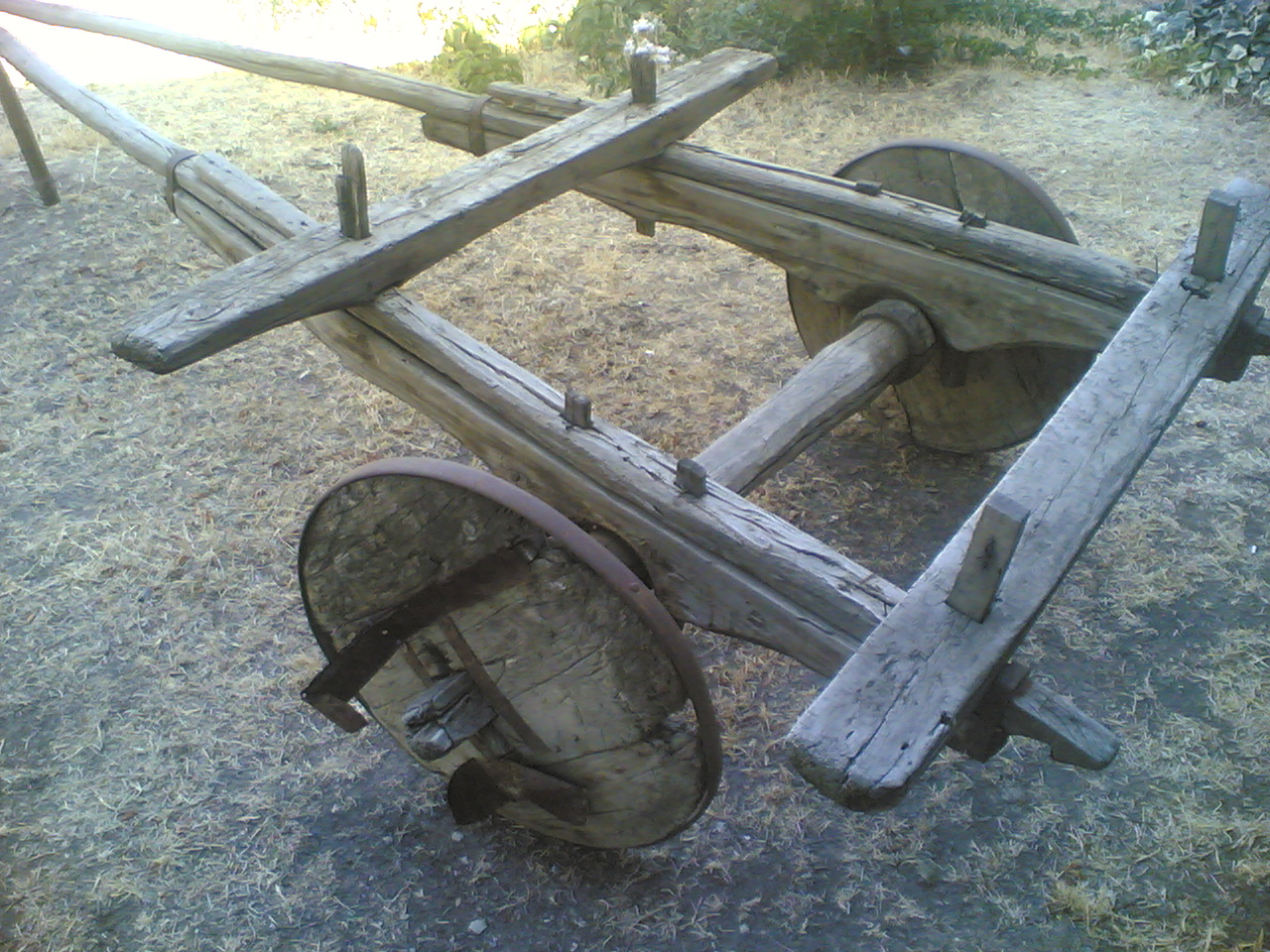
Turkish: kağnı (Ottoman Turkish: gaŋlı) refers to two-wheeled wagons

Kara-Khanid lexicographer Mahmud al-Kashgari mentioned a Kipchak chief surnamed Qanglı and simply glossed Qanglı as "a wagon for carrying load". Supposedly, they might be identified as or closely related to Kipchaks; or formed part of the Pechenegs, or were of Tiele origin. Gaoche, Chinese exonomy for Tiele means "high cart".

Byzantine Emperor Constantine VII mentions three Pecheneg tribes collectively known as the Kangar in his De Administrando Imperio. Kangar is associated with Kang territory and probably with the Kangaris people and the city of Kangu Tarban, mentioned in the Kul Tigin inscription of the Orkhon Turkic peoples.

Still, the relationship between the Kanglys, the Kangars, and the Kangaris / Kengeres (allies of the Eastern Turkic Khaganate against the Western Turkic Khaganate), is still unclear.

They may have even been a branch of the Göktürks, who were conquered by the Tang dynasty of China..

Peter Golden and Istvan Vásáry propose their name derives from the region Kang (ha) (= K'ang-chü of the Chinese sources = Syr Darya region). However, the Tang dynasty historical text Tang Huiyao apparently distinguished the Kangheli (= Kangly) from the Kang nation, another name of the Kangju nation, by distinguishing the Kangheli's horses from the Kang nation's horses, identified with the Dayuan horses.

== History ==
After the fall of the Pecheneg Khanate in the early 10th century, the role of the Kanglys became prominent. Different Pontic Steppe's Turkic nomadic peoples, who might have been separate and distinct earlier, would eventually become assimilated into each other by the 13th century. The eastern grouping of Cumania was indeed known as Qanglı (Latin: Cangle).

Many Kangly warriors joined the Khwarezmid Empire in the 11th century. In 1175 some of them lived north of Lake Balkhash and transferred their allegiance from the Qara Khitai (Western Liao dynasty) to the Jin dynasty.

They were conquered by Genghis Khan's armies during the Mongol conquest of Central Asia in 1219–1223. All Kanglys in Bukhara who were taller than a wheel, were slain by the Mongols. Jochi subdued remnants who still lived in the land of the Kyrghyz and Kipchak steppes in 1225. Khwarizmi Kangly remnants submitted to Great Khan Ögedei after a long resistance under Jalal al-Din Mangburni against his general Chormaqan and governor Chin-temur. After the Mongol conquest, the remaining Kanglys were absorbed into other Turks and Mongols. Some of them who served in the Yuan dynasty became Kharchins.

There are Kangly clans among the Kazakhs, Uzbeks, Kyrgyz, Bashkirs, Nogais, Karakalpaks and Yakuts (Sakha).

== Kazakh-Kangly (Qangly) ==
=== Historical Role and Alliances ===
- Saving the Qataghan Clan: A significant moment involving the Qanly clan occurred in 1627 when they saved a large part of the Qataghan clan following a civil war. The Qataghan clan had been defeated by the forces of the Alašmany led by Yesim Khan, resulting in many Qataghans dispersing to parts of Central Asia. Qanly preserved a portion of the Qataghan clan, and the two clans became allied partners, working together, sometimes referred to as the Shanyshqyl and Qanly partnership.
- Displacing the Dulat Clan: Towards the end of the 17th century, the Dulat clan dominated the Senior Zhuz and controlled Tashkent, extracting substantial revenue from the city. The Qanly, along with the Shanyshqyl and Ramdan clans, formed a coalition to successfully oust the Dulat clan from control of Tashkent. Consequently, many Qanly people reside in the environs of Tashkent today.

=== Clan Status and Relationships ===
- Senior Zhuz: Qanly, along with Shanyshqyl and Zhalaiyr, are noted as being among the clans that did not belong to the large Uisun clan cluster within the Senior Zhuz.
- Minority Status: After the civil war of 1627, Qanly and Shanyshqyl were relatively few in number, which meant they were not particularly prominent.

=== Genetic and Ancestral Information ===
- Genetic Connection: In terms of genetics, the Kazakh Qanly largely coincide with the Qulan Qypchaqs, suggesting shared origins.
- Research Status: Research into the Qanly clan's origins is ongoing, and a great deal of work remains to be done. The clan is part of a larger historical group that existed even before the Mongol era, with historical sources noting that Qanly were often situated near Qypchaqs and historically fought against the Oghuz. Data is available for Bashkir and Kazakh Qanly, some information exists for Karakalpak Qanly, but there is no data available for Kyrgyz Qand (or Qanly).

== See also ==
- Kangar union
- Kangju
- History of the central steppe
