= Kurya (khan) =

Pecheneg khan

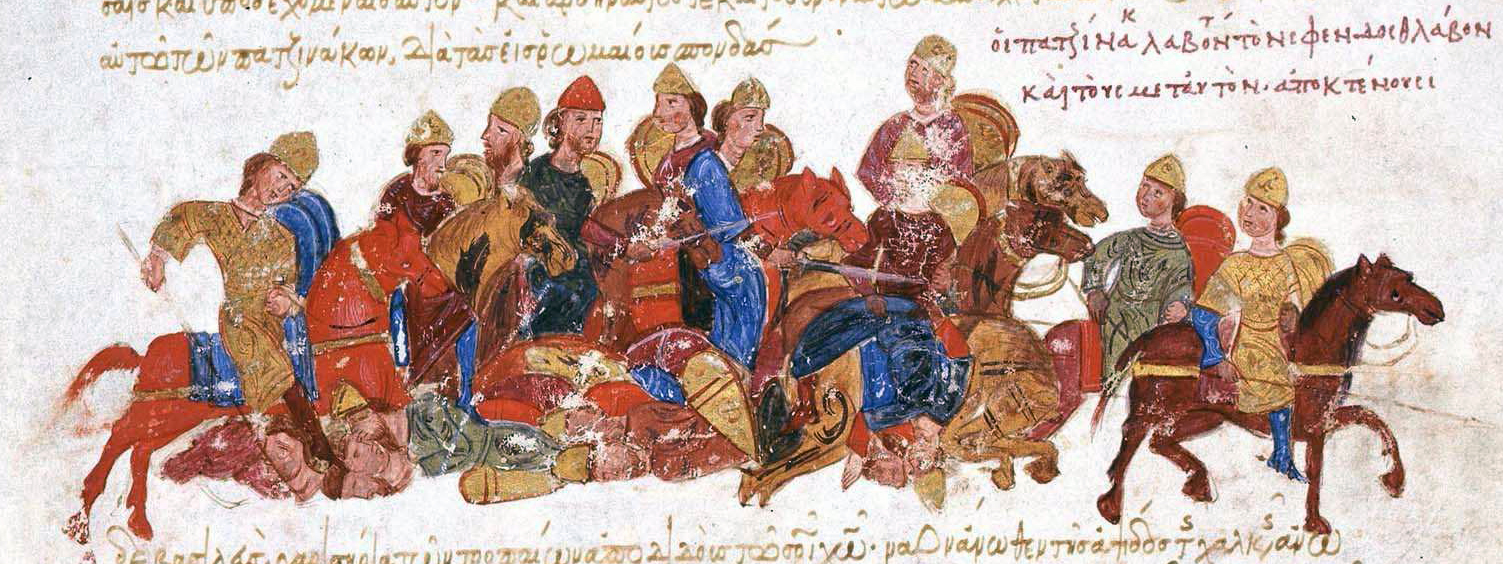
Kurya and the Pechenegs slaughter Sviatoslav and his army.

Kurya (Ukrainian: Куря, Pecheneg: *Kürä) was a Pecheneg prince and khan who allied with Svyatoslav I of Kiev in his campaigns in the Balkans. Later, after Svyatoslav's defeat by the Byzantine Empire, Kurya ambushed and killed the Kievan grand prince at Khortytsia. According to the Chronicle of Bygone Years, Kurya had Svyatoslav's skull made into a goblet (a known practice in Eurasian nomadic cultures for brave foes), and gilded. Dates of his rule are unknown, but he was no longer khan somewhere around 988 CE, being succeeded by Metiga. It is also possible that he was the leader of the Pechenegs in the 968 siege of Kiev, but since a starting date is unknown, it is almost impossible to tell (and it could have been any of several other Pecheneg princes). Kurya appears as a villain in the 2006 animated film Prince Vladimir.

== Life ==
Very little is known of Kurya's life. Apparently, Kurya and his wife drank from the gilded chalice made from Svyatoslav's skull and prayed for a son as brave as him (it is unknown if he had any children). Only mentioned in the Primary Chronicle, Kurya was the most powerful of the Pecheneg princes - Rus' historians included only his name in the Chronicle (a history of the Rus') when it was being compiled. In the late 1520s, however, the Nikonian Chronicle was created. A compilation of Rus' chronicles, it mentioned Pecheneg prince Ildeya as coming into the service of Yaropolk I. Around 988, Pecheneg leader Metiga did the same for Vladimir the Great - therefore Kurya was no longer khan by 988. However, what occurred after the death of Svyatoslav is not recorded, and Kurya's reign can be pinpointed to the 970s; this is not to say that he was not in power earlier, as there is no timeline for his rule until 988, when Metiga had definitely replaced him.

== Death of Svyatoslav ==
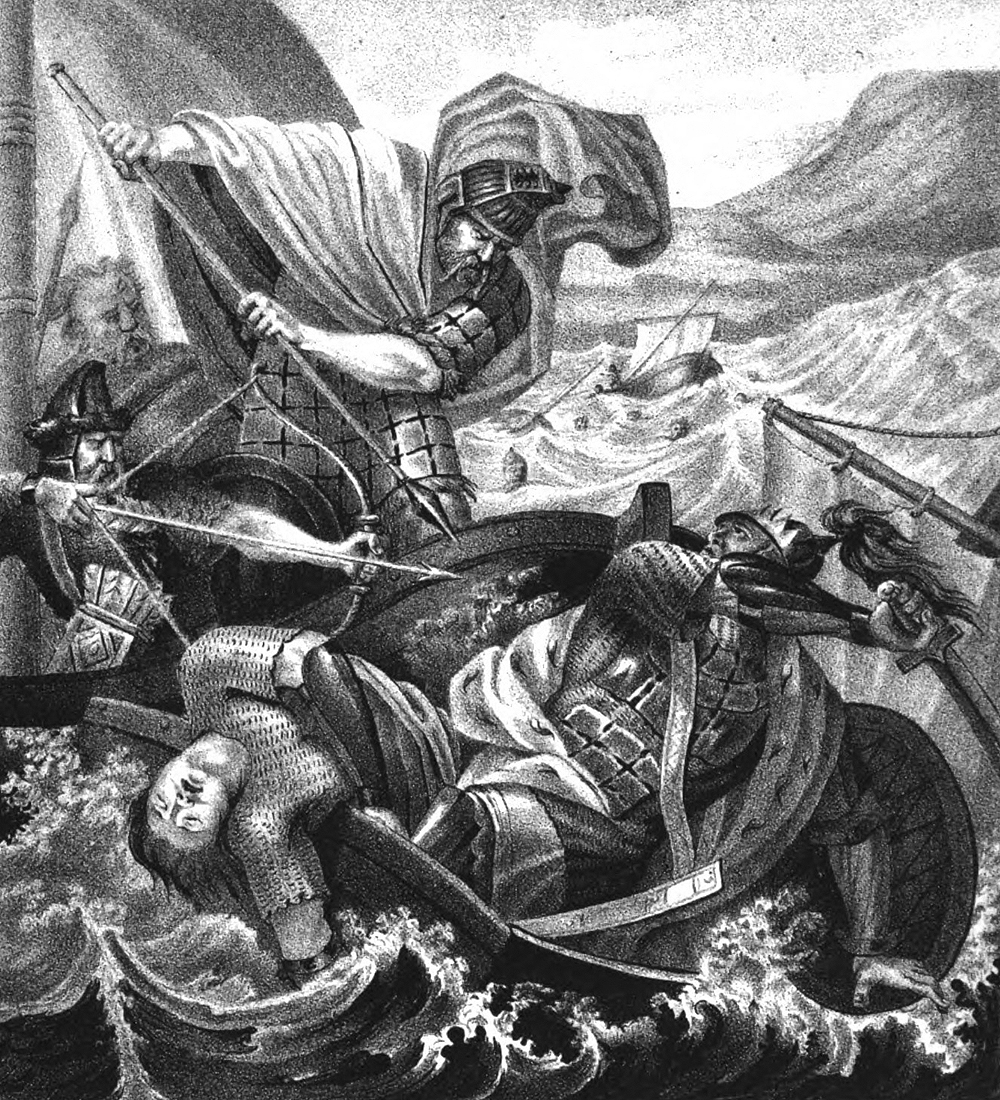
Boris Chorikov's The Death of Svyatoslav (Konchina Svyatoslava)

The Pechenegs were allied with Byzantium during Kurya's life (having a complicated relationship with the Rus'). Svyatoslav's Rus' had invaded the Balkan Bulgars in 967 or 968, assisting the Byzantines. However, the Slavic grand prince's campaign had greatly exceeded the expectations of the Byzantines, under Emperor Nikephoros Phokas. Svyatoslav refused to turn over his territorial victories to the Empire (he had been paid 15,000 pounds of gold), thus the two parties dropped their alliance. After some fighting and disturbances, Svyatoslav's retreat point was besieged by the Byzantines. He surrendered and left the Balkans, relinquishing his territory while doing so.

Having ceded his territories in the Danube region, Svyatoslav began to return to Kiev. Although he had been defeated, new Byzantine Emperor John I Tzimiskes (who had assassinated and overthrown Phokas) worried that the peace treaty he had forced Svyatoslav to sign between the Empire and Rus' would not last. Therefore, at the behest of Byzantium, the Pechenegs (led by Kurya) ambushed Svyatoslav and his army when he attempted to cross the cataracts near Khortytsia, at the Dnieper River, in March 972. His army took heavy losses, and the grand prince himself was slain.
