= Lajos Ligeti =

Hungarian orientalist and philologist

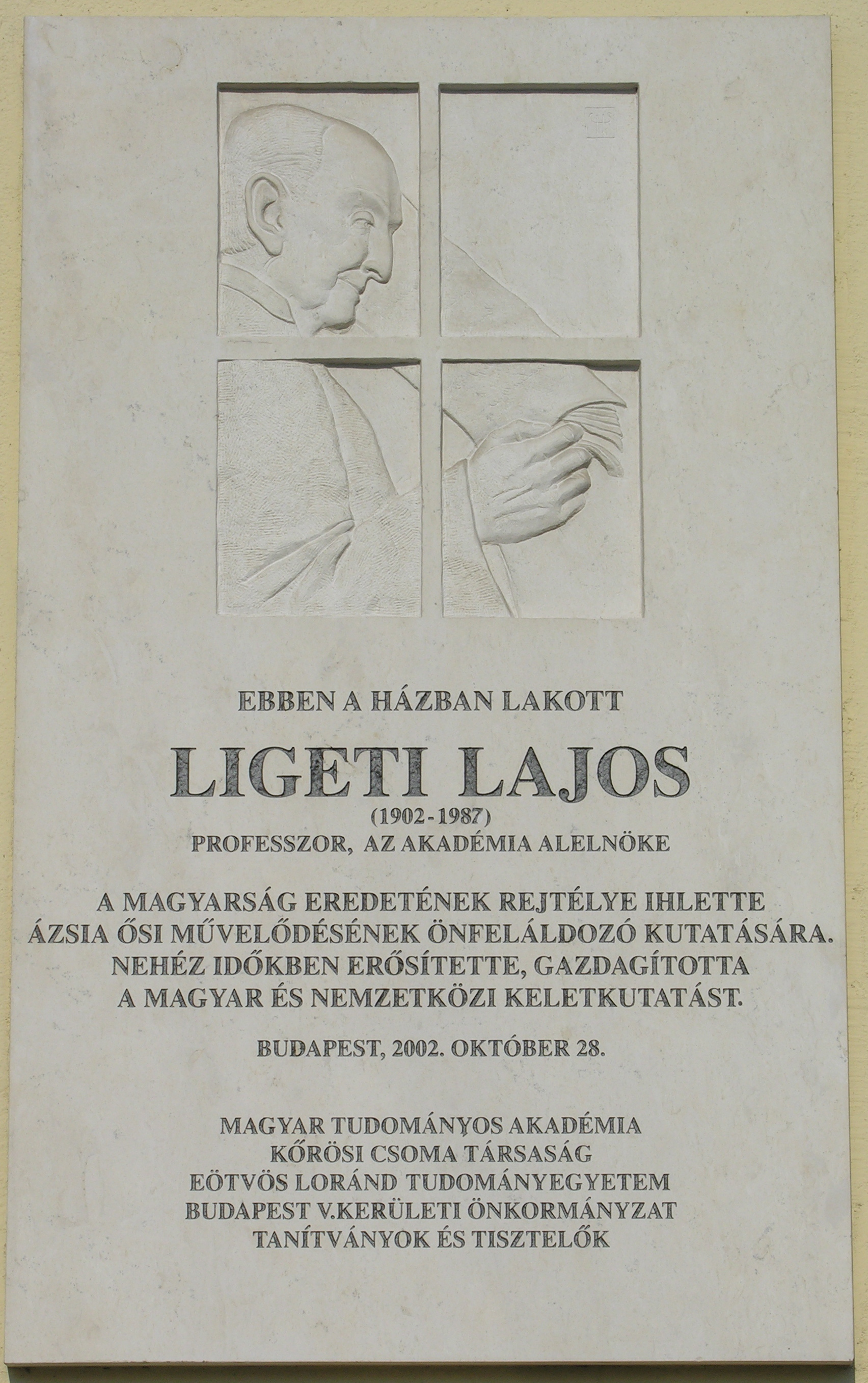
Commemorative plaque of Lajos Ligeti in Budapest District V, Belgrád Quay No 26

Lajos Ligeti (28 October 1902 – 24 May 1987) was a Hungarian orientalist and philologist, who specialized in Mongolian and Turkic languages.

Ligeti was born in Balassagyarmat in 1902. After completing his secondary studies in his native town, he entered the prestigious Eötvös-Kollégium. He studied classical languages, but concentrated on Turkish and Hungarian philology at Budapest University under both Gyula Németh and Zoltán Gombocz, obtaining his doctorate in 1925. He spent three years on a scholarship in post-doctoral research in Paris where he studied Chinese under Henri Maspero, Tibetan under Jacques Bacot, and Mongolian and Inner Asian languages under Paul Pelliot, one of the three students, the others being Denis Sinor and Francis Cleaves who carried on Pelliot's work in Mongolian studies, and his closest disciple.

From 1928 to 1930 he engaged in field research in Inner Mongolia, and, while staying in lamaseries, mastered Chakhar, Kharchin and Dagur, while collecting extensive sources in manuscript. He later described the results of his investigations into Mongolian Buddhist canon, totalling 108 works, in his Catalogue du Kanjur mongol, (1942–1944). He obtained a teaching position specializing in Inner Asian studies at Pázmány Péter Catholic University in 1931. After his election as a corresponding member of the Hungarian Academy of Sciences in 1936, he did further fieldwork among both the Moghuls, and the Uzbeks, from 1936 to 1937. In 1940 he assumed the chair of Inner Asian Studies at Budapest, university, where he introduced coursework on Mongolian, Tibetan and Manchu. He also played a key role in the development of Hungarian sinology. In 1949, he was awarded the Kossuth Prize (1949) and in the following year he launched the Acta Orientalia. Among his translations are The Secret History of the Mongols (1962) and the Elegant Sayings of Sakya Pandita (1984).

Though much was lost in the upheavals of World War Two, he managed to conserve important texts in old Mongolian, Manchu, Tibetan and Chinese, which he later gave to the Hungarian Academy. He donated his 11,000 volume private library to the Klebelsberg Library, University of Szeged.

Ligeti died in Budapest in 1987.

== Sources ==
- Atwood, Christopher P. (2008). "Paul Pelliot and Mongolian Studies". In Drège, J.-P.; Zink, M. (eds.). Paul Pelliot: de l'histoire à la légende. Académie des Inscriptions et Belles-Lettres. pp. 433–449. ISBN 978-2-87754-290-6.
- Róna-Tas, András (June 2012). "In Memoriam Lajos Ligeti (1902-1987)". Acta Orientalia Academiae Scientiarum Hungaricae. 65 (2): 123–136. JSTOR 43282453.
