= Pečenice =

Pečenice Hontbesenyőd
- Municipality
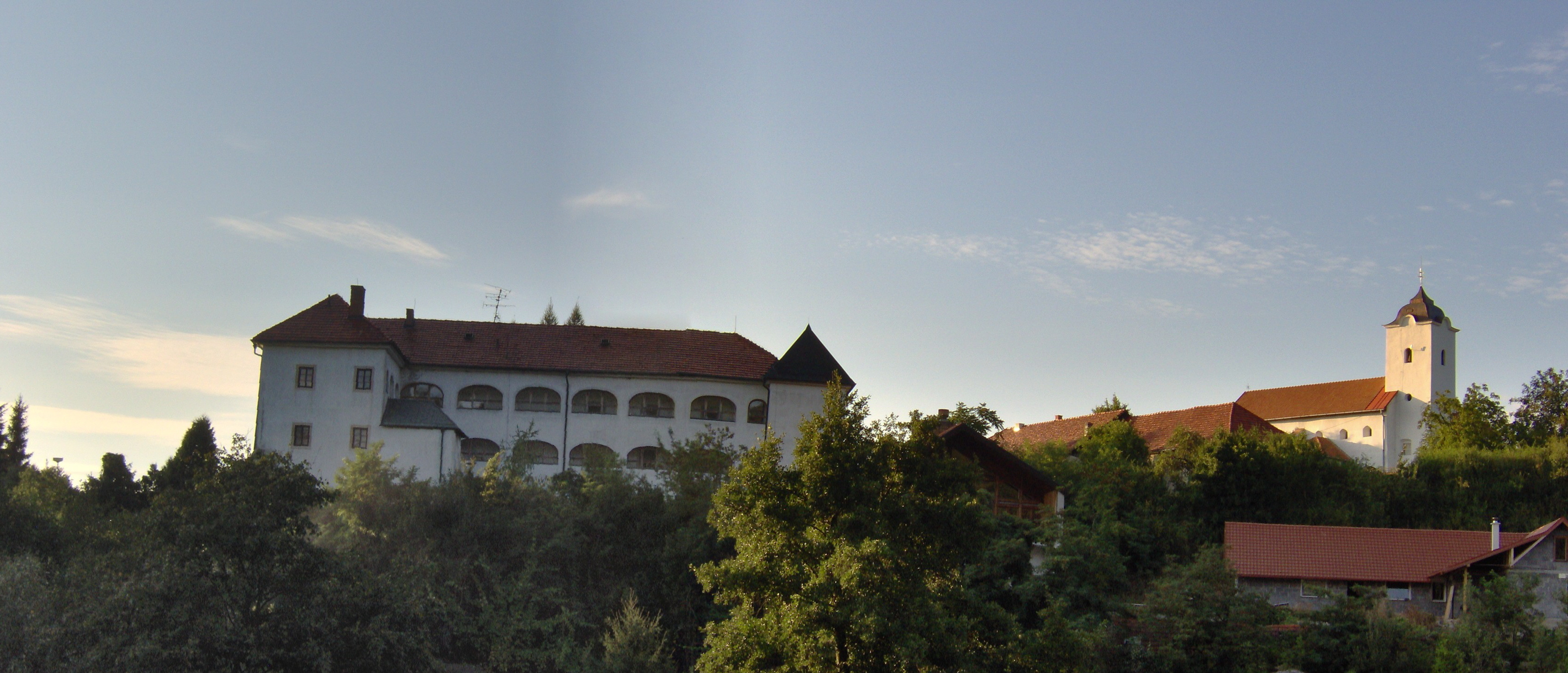
- Monastery in Pečenice

- Flag

- Location of Pečenice in the Nitra Region Location of Pečenice in Slovakia
- Coordinates: 48.30°N 18.78°E
- Country: Slovakia
- Region: Nitra Region
- District: Levice District
- First mentioned: 1135

Area
  - Total: 7.91 km^{2} (3.05 sq mi)
- Elevation: 253 m (830 ft)

Population (2025)
  - Total: 132
- Time zone: UTC+1 (CET)
  - Summer (DST): UTC+2 (CEST)
- Postal code: 935 03
- Area code: +421 36
- Vehicle registration plate (until 2022): LV

Pečenice (Hungarian: Hontbesenyőd, previously Pecsenic) is a village and municipality in the Levice District in the Nitra Region of Slovakia, on the edge of the Štiavnica Mountains. It is noted for its vineyards and viticulture.

== Geography ==
The municipality lies at an altitude of 253 metres (830 ft) and covers an area of 7.91 km^{2} (3.05 sq mi) (2025).

== History ==
The village was first mentioned in 1135 as Sceleus (Hungarian for "vineyard").

The Late Romanesque parish church, dedicated to the Assumption of the Virgin Mary, dates from the mid-13th century. It once belonged to the Premonstratensian monastery at Šahy.

In the deep forest near the village runs a masonry wall 67 kilometres long known as the Spečený val or the Val Obrov (Latin: Fossa Giganteum). It has never been scientifically investigated and its age and origin are unknown. There are many theories about it, including that it marks the limit of the Roman Empire.

== Population ==
Population statistic (10 years)
Year	1995	2005	2015	2025
Count	144	127	119	132
Difference		−11.80%	−6.29%	+10.92%

Population statistic
Year	2024	2025
Count	127	132
Difference		+3.93%

It has a population of 132 people (31 December 2025).

=== Ethnicity ===
Census 2021 (1+ %)
Ethnicity	Number	Fraction
Slovak	124	97.63%
Not found out	3	2.36%
Total	127	

In year 2021 was 127 people by ethnicity 124 as Slovak, 3 as Not found out, 1 as Czech and 1 as Other.

Note on population: The difference values of population numbers in the table "Population statistic" and in the sections "Ethnicity" & "Religion" is caused by the use of various statistical methods.

=== Religion ===
Census 2021 (1+ %)
Religion	Number	Fraction
Roman Catholic Church	91	71.65%
None	25	19.69%
Not found out	3	2.36%
Evangelical Church	3	2.36%
Ad hoc movements	2	1.57%
Total	127	

In year 2021 was 127 people by religion 91 from Roman Catholic Church, 25 from None, 3 from Not found out, 3 from Evangelical Church, 2 from Ad hoc movements, 1 from Calvinist Church, 1 from Paganism and natural spirituality and 1 from Greek Catholic Church.

== Facilities ==
The village has a public library and football pitch.
