= Oleśnica, Świętokrzyskie Voivodeship =

Oleśnica
- Town
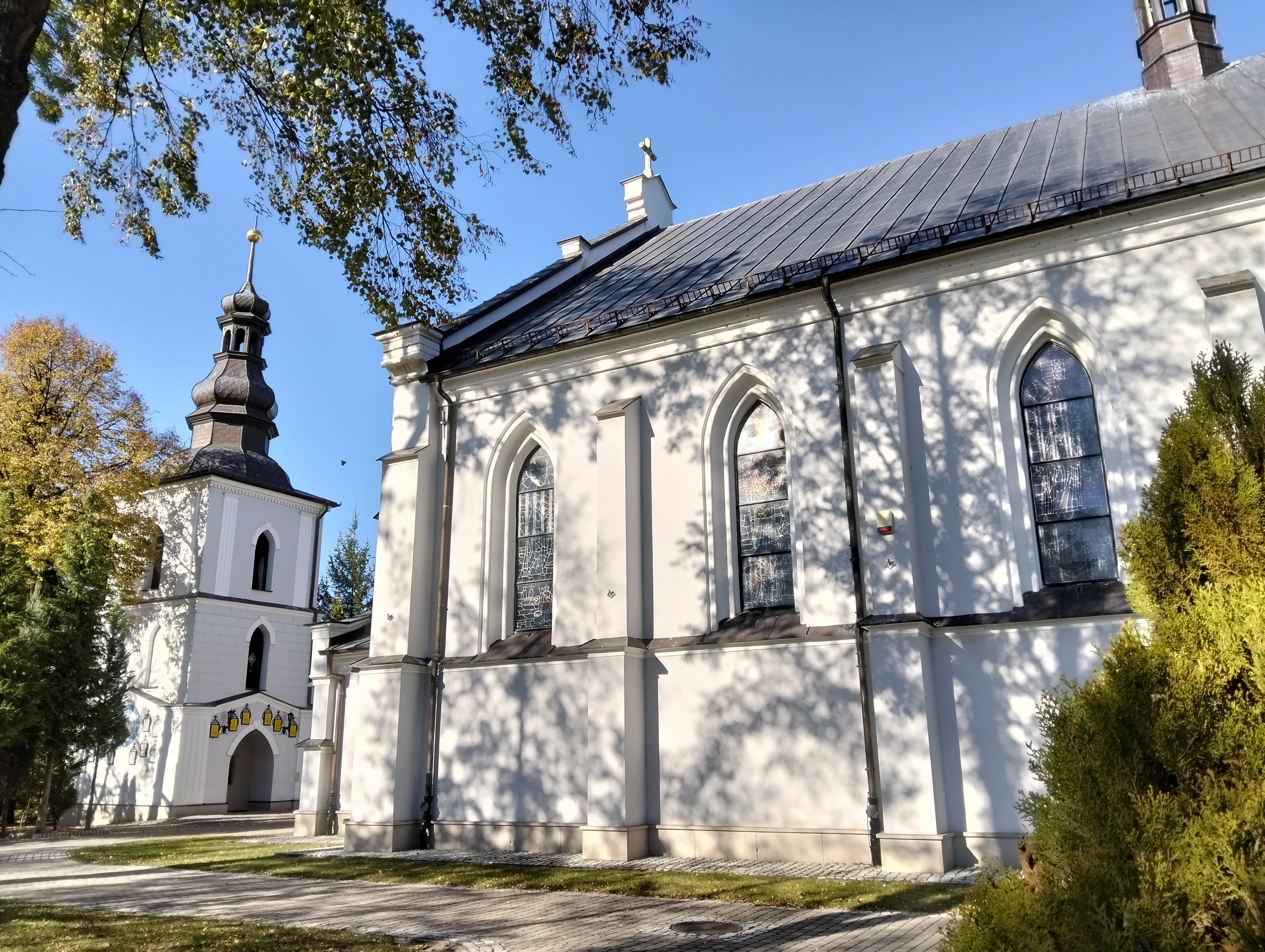
- Church of the Assumption in Oleśnica

- Coat of arms

- Location within Poland
- Coordinates: 50°27′12″N 21°03′54″E
- Country: Poland
- Voivodeship: Świętokrzyskie
- County: Staszów
- Gmina: Oleśnica
- Sołectwo: Oleśnica
- Elevation: 182.1 m (597 ft)

Population (31 December 2009 at Census)
  - Total: ▲1,962
- Time zone: UTC+1 (CET)
  - Summer (DST): UTC+2 (CEST)
- Postal code: 28–220
- Area code: +48 41
- Car plates: TSZ
- Website: http://www.olesnica.realnet.pl/

Oleśnica (Polish: [ɔlɛˈɕɲit͡sa]) is a town in Staszów County, Świętokrzyskie Voivodeship, in south-central Poland. It is the seat of the gmina (administrative district) called Gmina Oleśnica. It lies in historic Lesser Poland, approximately 15 km (9 mi) south-west of Staszów and 58 km (36 mi) south-east of the regional capital Kielce.

== History ==
During the reign of King Casimir III the Great, Oleśnica was the seat of a Roman Catholic parish, which covered the area of 49 square kilometers. The village furthermore served as main residence of the noble Oleśnicki family (later, it belonged to the Zborowski family and the Lubomirski family). The father of Cardinal Zbigniew Oleśnicki was born here.

Oleśnica received Magdeburg rights in the year 1470, and during the Polish Golden Age, it was a small town, with 12 artisans. Furthermore, since the mid-16th century, it was a local center of the Protestant Reformation, with a Calvinist prayer house, opened here in 1563 by Mikolaj Zborowski. The population of the town remained small – in 1673, it was only 184. Oleśnica was completely destroyed in the Great Northern War.

After the late-18th-century Partitions of Poland it briefly belonged to the Habsburg Empire. After the Polish victory in the Austro-Polish War of 1809, it was regained by Poles and included within the short-lived Duchy of Warsaw. After its dissolution in 1815, it was part of the Russian-controlled Congress Poland, where it remained until 1915. Due to proximity of the tightly locked Austrian–Russian border, Oleśnica's development was halted, and finally, after the January Uprising, it lost the town charter. After World War I, Poland regained independence and control of Oleśnica. According to the 1921 census, it had a population of 1,133, 97.5% Polish and 2.5% Jewish.

Following the German-Soviet invasion of Poland, which started World War II in September 1939, it was occupied by Germany.

Several notable people were born in or connected with Oleśnica. Among them were Dobieslaw Oleśnicki, the castellan of Wojnicz, Lublin and Sandomierz, the starosta of Kraków, who participated in the Battle of Grunwald and commanded the siege of the Malbork Castle in 1410, and Cardinal Zbigniew Olesnicki, the Bishop of Krakow in 1423–1455, as well as many members of the Zborowski family.
