= Cui Youfu =

8th-century Chinese official

Cui Youfu (崔祐甫) (721 – July 7, 780), courtesy name Yisun (貽孫), was a Chinese politician. He served as a chancellor briefly early during the reign of Emperor Dezong. He was credited for governing in an effective manner and guiding Emperor Dezong to correct decisions that, for some time, evoked comparisons between Emperor Dezong and his well-regarded ancestors Emperor Taizong and Emperor Xuanzong.

== Background ==
Cui Youfu was born in 721, during the reign of Emperor Xuanzong. His family was from "the second house of Boling" of the prominent Cui clan of Boling. His grandfather, whose name was either Cui Zhi (崔晊) or Cui Hao (崔皓), was a prefectural secretary general and carried the title of Duke of Anping. His father Cui Mian (崔沔) served as Huangmen Shilang (黃門侍郎), the deputy head of the examination bureau of government (門下省, Menxia Sheng) and carried the title of Duke of Qinghe. His household was said to prize its honesty, frugality, and rituals.

At some point, Cui Youfu passed the imperial examinations, and he later served as the sheriff of Shou'an County (壽安, in modern Luoyang, Henan). When the rebel general An Lushan, in 755, captured Luoyang, then the Tang eastern capital, both officials and commoners fled Luoyang in earnest, but Cui, before doing so, risked being harmed during the battle and went back to his ancestral shrine to take the spirit tablets with him. He later successively served an imperial archiver and a low-level official at the ministry of civil service affairs (吏部, Libu). Later, he served as a commander at Yongping Circuit (永平, then headquartered in modern Anyang, Henan) and then Yongping Circuit's liaison officer at the Tang capital Chang'an. He was known for his integrity and bluntness.

== During Emperor Daizong's reign ==
Sometime before 777, Cui Youfu became a Zhongshu Sheren (中書舍人), a mid-level official at the legislative bureau (中書省, Zhongshu Sheng). Later, as there was no Zhongshu Ling (中書令, head of the legislative bureau) or Zhongshu Shilang (中書侍郎, deputy head of the legislative bureau) at the time, Cui Youfu, as the senior Zhongshu Sheren effectively ran the legislative bureau. After Chang Gun became chancellor in 777, however, Chang, pointing out that his responsibility as chancellor included responsibility to oversee the legislative bureau as well, took over the responsibilities from Cui and removed Cui's desk, drawing Cui's resentment. Chang tried to defuse it by putting Cui in charge of selecting officials at the ministry of civil service affairs, but they often ran into disputes as to which officials to select. In 778, there was an incident when the general Zhu Ci submitted what he thought to be a sign of fortune—a mouse living peacefully with a cat and her kittens. Chang considered this a sign of fortune and congratulated Emperor Daizong, but Cui, argued that this was against the cat's nature and was a sign that officials were not carrying out their responsibilities. Emperor Daizong agreed, but this agreement further drew anger from Chang.

== During Emperor Dezong's reign ==
Emperor Daizong died in 779 and was succeeded by his son Emperor Dezong. During Emperor Daizong's mourning period, Chang Gun and Cui Youfu got into a serious conflict over how many days the officials should wear mourning clothes. Chang advocated that because, by custom, Emperor Dezong was to wear mourning clothes for 27 days, so should the officials. Cui advocated that, because Emperor Daizong's will specified three days, the officials should wear the mourning clothes for three days. Chang got sufficiently angry over the argument that he submitted an accusation against Cui, stating that Cui had frivolously changed the proper regulation of the rites and requesting that Cui be demoted to be the prefect of Chao Prefecture (潮州, in modern Chaozhou, Guangdong). Emperor Dezong, believing the demotion to be too severe, only ordered that Cui be demoted to be the deputy mayor of Henan Municipality (河南), encompassing the eastern capital Luoyang.

However, it would be this article of accusation that would be Chang's downfall. Chang was effectively serving as the only chancellor at the time, but Guo Ziyi and Zhu Ci, due to their battlefield accomplishments, also carried chancellor titles but were not exercising chancellor authorities. Pursuant to the customs at the time, Chang, in the article of accusation, also signed Guo's and Zhu's names for them. Once the demotion of Cui was announced, however, Guo and Zhu both submitted defenses of Cui—surprising Emperor Dezong, who asked them why they had asked for Cui's demotion and then defended him; they responded that they did not know about the accusation. Emperor Dezong, who was not familiar with the customs that one chancellor should sign for other chancellors, believed Chang to have falsified Guo's and Zhu's signatures. He immediately ordered that Chang be demoted to be the prefect of Chao Prefecture and recalled Cui to serve as Menxia Shilang (門下侍郎), the deputy head of the examination bureau, and further gave him the designation Tong Zhongshu Menxia Pingzhangshi (同中書門下平章事), making him a chancellor de facto. However, Emperor Dezong still accepted Chang's proposal as to the mourning period.

While Chang served as chancellor, he set strict guidelines for the commissioning of officials, to reform the corruption that had become rampant during the administrations of prior chancellors Yuan Zai and Wang Jin. As a result, however, many offices were left unfilled as strict examinations were carried out of the candidates. After Cui became chancellor, he quickly filled the offices with people he recommended, and within 200 days, he commissioned over 800 officials. While he was praised for his quick reaction for this in the Old Book of Tang, the author of the Zizhi Tongjian (the Song dynasty historian Sima Guang) criticized him for overreaction to Chang's own overreaction to Yuan and Wang, and further criticized him for overly relying on commissions of people that he knew—which he had defended as necessary for him to know their virtues and their abilities. Cui subsequently participated in the removal of the imperial guard general Wang Jiahe (王駕鶴), who had commanded the imperial guards for more than a decade, by summoning Wang to his office for a lengthy meeting, allowing Emperor Dezong's intended replacement, Bai Zhizhen (白志貞), to take over Wang's office during the meeting.

Meanwhile, the military governor (jiedushi) Li Zhengji, who had ruled his Pinglu Circuit (平盧, headquartered in modern Tai'an, Shandong) as his own realm semi-independent from imperial rule, had wanted to placate Emperor Dezong by offering a large tribute in money. Emperor Dezong considered accepting it, but was concerned that if he publicly did so, Li Zhengji might renege and use this incident to humiliate him. Cui suggested that Emperor Dezong issue an edict accepting the tribute and immediately awarding the tribute to Pinglu soldiers, to show that the emperor had concern for Pinglu soldiers and to show the other circuits that he did not love money. Emperor Dezong agreed, and this handling much impressed and embarrassed Li Zhengji.

In fall 779, by Cui's recommendation, Emperor Dezong made Yang Yan a chancellor as well, and he also made another senior official, Qiao Lin, a chancellor as well. Meanwhile, he and Yang disagreed as to whether a high-level official who had been in charge of economic matters, Liu Yan, should be investigated for having supported making Emperor Daizong's favorite concubine Consort Dugu empress during Emperor Daizong's reign. (As Consort Dugu was not Emperor Dezong's mother and had her own son, Li Jiong (李迥) the Prince of Han, it was believed that such a move would have potentially endangered Emperor Dezong's position.) Yang, who was an associate of Yuan's and who believed that Liu was responsible for Yuan's fall from grace and death, wanted to investigate Liu to avenge Yuan, but Cui rebuffed him.

By winter 779, Cui was seriously ill. Emperor Dezong allowed him to come to office in a litter. Whenever Cui had to be home due to illness, Emperor Dezong sent eunuchs to Cui's mansion to request his opinions on important matters. With Cui ill, however, Yang was largely in control of the government. Cui died in summer 780. He was buried with great honors and was given the posthumous name Wenzhen (文貞, meaning "civil and honest"). As he was sonless, he designated his nephew Cui Zhi as his heir. (Cui Zhi would later serve as a chancellor during the reign of Emperor Dezong's great-grandson Emperor Muzong.) During the time Cui was chancellor, he encouraged Emperor Dezong to be lenient, causing Emperor Dezong to be compared to his highly regarded ancestors Emperor Taizong and Emperor Xuanzong.

== Notes and references ==
- Old Book of Tang, vol. 119.
- New Book of Tang, vol. 142.
- Zizhi Tongjian, vols. 225, 226.
