= Yang Yan (Tang dynasty) =

Chinese historian and politician (727–781)

Yang Yan (simplified Chinese: 杨炎; traditional Chinese: 楊炎; pinyin: Yáng Yán; Wade–Giles: Yang^{²} Yen^{²}; 727–781), courtesy name Gongnan (公南), was a Chinese historian and politician serving as a chancellor early in the reign of Emperor Dezong. He was credited with reforming the tax system to reduce burdens on the peasants and to bring merchants into the rank of taxpayers, but was blamed for using his position to take vengeance on political enemies. He was removed in 781 and soon executed.

== Background ==
Yang Yan was born in 727, during the reign of Emperor Xuanzong. His family was from Fengxiang (鳳翔, in modern Baoji, Shaanxi) and claimed ancestry through officials of the Warring States period state Han), Qin, Han, and Sui dynasties, although the lineage was not completely traceable. His great-grandfather Yang Dabao (楊大寶) served as a county magistrate during the reign of the Tang dynasty's founder, Emperor Gaozu, and was killed when resisting a rival contender for the throne, Liu Wuzhou the Dingyang Khan, and therefore was posthumously honored. His grandfather Yang Zhe (楊哲) was known for his filial piety. His father, Yang Bo (楊播), was known for having passed the imperial examinations but then declined official offices to support his parents, an act for which he was honored by both Emperor Xuanzong and Emperor Xuanzong's son Emperor Suzong.

== Early career ==
Yang Yan was known in his youth for his handsome eyebrows and beard, his ability to stand up against monetary enticements, and his beautiful writing. In his home region, he became known as the younger Yang Shanren (山人), implying that he was a Taoist hermit. Later, he took off his hermit robes and served as a secretary under Lü Chongbi (呂崇賁) the military governor (Jiedushi) of Hexi Circuit (河西, headquartered in modern Wuwei, Gansu). He had previously been humiliated by Li Dajian (李大簡), and he became a colleague of Li's after he came to serve under Lü, and he took the opportunity, on one occasion, to batter Li severely along with his guards, almost causing Li's death. Lü, however, favored his talent and did not punish him. Later, when the major general Li Guangbi invited him to serve as an assistant, he declined, and he also declined a promotion to serve as an imperial chronicler at the capital Chang'an. Instead, he returned home to support his mother. After his mother died, he was honored for his filial piety to her—and it was said that it was unprecedented, at that point, that a household would be decorated for three straight generations for their filial piety.

After Yang completed his period of mourning, he became Sixun Yuanwailang (司勳員外郎), a low-level official at the ministry of civil service affairs (吏部, Libu), and later served at the ministries of defense (兵部, Bingbu) and the ministry of rites (禮部, Libu). While serving at the ministry of rites, he became one of the main drafters of edicts for Emperor Suzong's son Emperor Daizong. Both he and his colleague Chang Gun were known for the beautiful language they used in writing edicts—with Chang being known for his ability to cite ancient precedents, and Yang known for the ability to use appropriate praises. When he wrote the text of a monument dedicated to the general Li Kailuo (李楷洛), the writing was so beautiful that the scholars at the time all took pains to memorize it. He later became the deputy minister of civil service affairs (吏部侍郎, Libu Shilang) and was put in charge of editing the imperial history. He also became well regarded by the powerful chancellor Yuan Zai and was fostered by Yuan to be his successor. After Yuan was executed for corruption in 777, Emperor Daizong initially wanted to execute Yang and some other close associates of Yuan's as well, but Emperor Daizong's uncle Wu Cou (吳湊) persuaded him not to do so. Instead, Yang was demoted to be the military advisor to the prefect of Dao Prefecture (道州, in modern Yongzhou, Hunan).

== During Emperor Dezong's reign ==
In 779, Emperor Daizong died and was succeeded by his son Emperor Dezong. Emperor Dezong, wanting to reform government, was willing to promote people in exceptional manners, and in fall 779, based on the recommendation of the chancellor Cui Youfu, Emperor Dezong promoted Yang from exile to be the Menxia Shilang (門下侍郎), the deputy head of the examination bureau of government (門下省, Menxia Sheng) and gave him the designation Tong Zhongshu Menxia Pingzhangshi (同中書門下平章事), making him a chancellor de facto, serving alongside Cui and Qiao Lin.

As chancellor, Yang quickly carried out a number of actions that were praised by contemporaries and/or later historians:

- Promoting Li Gao (李皋) the Prince of Cao, a capable official of imperial descent who had been demoted due to false accusations by Xin Jinggao (辛京杲).
- Keeping the general Cui Ning, the military governor of Sichuan Circuit (西川, headquartered in modern Chengdu, Sichuan), who had controlled the circuit semi-independently from the imperial government, at Chang'an when Cui arrived at Chang'an to pay homage to Emperor Dezong, thus allowing the imperial government to take back control of Sichuan.
- Convincing Emperor Dezong to return the responsibility of collecting and storing money and silk revenues from Daying Storage (大盈庫), inside the palace and managed by eunuchs, to the ministry of storage (太府寺, Taifu Si), thus restoring accountability.

What Yang became most known for, however, was his reform of the taxation system, introduced in an edict by Emperor Dezong in 780. As described by the Song dynasty historian Sima Guang in his Zizhi Tongjian, of the problems of the taxation system at the time and what Yang's reforms were intended to address:

Early in Tang Dynasty, the taxes and duties included the following: field tax [(租, Zu)], corvée [(庸, Yong)], and head tax [(捐, Juan)]. Those who had fields paid the field tax. Those who were adults served corvée labor. Those who had household rolls paid head tax. Toward the end of Emperor Xuanzong's reign, the government files were being poorly maintained, and the records were often not matching reality. During the Zhide era [(756–758, during Emperor Suzong's reign)], the state was in war and chaos, and the collections of taxes were both done in an emergency and a haphazard manner. More and more tax collection agencies were created, but none supervised another, and therefore they created new methods and laws for taxation. Before the old tax would be abolished, the new tax would already be implemented, without ceasing. The rich households had many men, but they avoided taxes by becoming officials or becoming Buddhist monks, and the poor households were unable to avoid taxes in this manner. Therefore, the rich households became richer, and the poor households became poorer. Corrupt officials further used the opportunity to seize assets and oppress people. They collected taxes every 10 days or half month. The people could not endure this kind of cruel treatment, and often they fled to other locales just to make a living. Those who remained in their homes did not exceed 40% or 50%.

Yang Yan established the Law of the Two Taxes [(兩稅法, Liangshuifa)]. The prefectural and county expenses were estimated in advance, and added to those expenses were the amounts they were supposed to submit to the central government. Then, that number becomes the overall tax burden for the people. No distinction made between people who were native to the locale or were new to the locale; as long as they had settled in the locale, they were registered on the tax rolls. There was no longer a division of young men [(over 17)] with mature men [(over 22)]; rather, division was by level of wealth. As for businessmen, they were given the responsibility of paying 1/30 of the tax burden, such that they were no longer able to evade tax responsibilities and would bear similar tax burdens to their farming neighbors. As for taxes on the farmers, they were collected twice a year, during the fall and summer. The field tax, corvée, and head tax, as well as other miscellaneous and harsh taxes were all abolished. The director of finances [(度支使, Duzhishi)] oversaw the taxes.

Meanwhile, though, Yang was also said to be vindictive. Blaming the senior official Liu Yan, one of the judges that adjudicated Yuan Zai's guilt, for Yuan's death and for his own demotion, he accused Liu of having encouraged Emperor Daizong to make his favorite concubine Consort Dugu empress—which would have endangered Emperor Dezong's position as crown prince since he was not Consort Dugu's son, and Consort Dugu had her own son, Li Jiong (李迥) the Prince of Han. At Cui Youfu's urging, who argued that such matters should no longer be considered since Emperor Dezong had issued a general pardon when he declared the Liangshuifa, Emperor Dezong did not, for the time being, investigate Liu. Still, at Yang's urging, he removed Liu from his various posts as directors of specialized financial agencies and returned the responsibilities to the executive bureau (尚書省, Shangshu Sheng). (Subsequently, however, with the executive bureau agencies unable to handle these financial matters, the specialized agencies were restored, although the responsibilities were given to Han Hui (韓洄) and Du You, not back to Liu.) Liu was also soon demoted and exiled to be the prefect of Zhong Prefecture (忠州, in modern Chongqing).

By spring 780, With Cui Youfu seriously ill at that point and Qiao having been removed by Emperor Dezong due to incompetence, Yang was solely in charge of the government, and he revived major military projects that Yuan had advocated until his downfall—to rebuild Yuan Prefecture (原州, in modern Guyuan, Ningxia), formerly Tang territory but which had become part of the no man's land between territories held by Tang and Tufan, as a forward advance base for a campaign to recapture lands lost to Tufan; and to conscript labor from the regions of the two capitals (Chang'an and Luoyang) and Guanzhong to reopen Lingyang Aqueduct (陵陽渠, flowing through Bayan Nur, Inner Mongolia) in order to promote agriculture in the region by soldiers. When Duan Xiushi, the military governor of Jingyuan Circuit (涇原, headquartered in modern Pingliang, Gansu) opposed the projects on account that it would provoke a Tufan attack, Yang, angered by Duan's opposition, had Duan recalled to the capital to serve in the relatively powerless post as minister of agriculture. When the disciplinarian general Li Huaiguang was subsequently named to succeed Duan, Duan's soldiers, fearing Li Huaiguang's harshness, rebelled under the leadership of the officer Liu Wenxi (劉文喜). While Liu was quickly killed by his own subordinates, and the rebellion dissipated, neither Yuan Prefecture nor Lingyang Aquedate was actually ever rebuilt.

Notwithstanding these projects, one of the agendas that Emperor Dezong had early in his reign was peace with Tufan, and he ordered a general release of Tufan captives. He also sent the official Wei Lun (韋倫) as an emissary to Tufan. When Wei requested that Emperor Dezong personally sign a letter offering peace addressed to the king of Tufan, Yang believed that this would overly dignify the Tufan king, and therefore requested that the senior general Guo Ziyi sign the letter, with Emperor Dezong writing, "approved," on the letter. Emperor Dezong agreed.

In fall 780, at Yang's direction, Liu Yan's superior Yu Zhun (庾準) the military governor of Jingnan Circuit (荊南, headquartered in modern Jingzhou, Hubei), accused Liu of complaining about Emperor Dezong in a letter to the general Zhu Ci, and of preparing to commit treason. Yang "confirmed" Yu's accusations, and Emperor Dezong had Liu put to death—drawing mourning from throughout the realm over the unfair treatment of the well-respected Liu. The warlord Li Zhengji, the military governor of Pinglu Circuit (平盧, headquartered in modern Tai'an, Shandong), in particular, was submitting repeated petitions criticizing the imperial government for executing Liu. Yang, in fear, sent his associates to the circuits to blame Liu's death on Emperor Dezong personally, over Emperor Dezong's resentment for Liu's support of Consort Dugu, and disavowing personal responsibility in Liu's death. When Emperor Dezong became aware that Yang was blaming him, he began to be resentful of Yang and considered killing him, but did not do so immediately. Rather, he promoted Lu Qi to also be a chancellor to divide Yang's power. Yang, looking down on Lu, as Lu was known to be ugly in appearance and untalented, would often refuse to have lunch with Lu even though chancellors were, by custom, to have lunches with each other on a regular basis. This thus drew resentment from Lu as well.

In 781, after Li Zhengji and fellow warlord Li Baochen, the military governor of Chengde Circuit (成德, headquartered in modern Shijiazhuang, Hebei), died, Emperor Dezong refused to let their sons (Li Na and Li Weiyue, respectively) to inherit their posts. Li Na and Li Weiyue, along with their allies Tian Yue the military governor of Weibo Circuit (魏博, headquartered in modern Handan, Hebei) and Liang Chongyi the military governor of Shannan East Circuit (山南東道, headquartered in modern Xiangfan, Hubei), thereafter prepared for war against the imperial government. One of the main advocates for an immediate attack against Liang was Li Xilie, the military governor of Huaixi Circuit (淮西, headquartered in modern Zhumadian, Henan), and Emperor Dezong put Li Xilie in charge of the campaign against Liang. Yang objected—pointing out that Li Xilie was himself disobedient of imperial edicts and had expelled his predecessor Li Zhongchen despite Li Zhongchen's kind treatment of him, and argued that if Li Xilie were successful, he would be so overconfident that the imperial government would no longer be able to control him. Emperor Dezong did not listen to Yang and became increasingly repulsed by Yang due to his opposition. When Li Xilie's army was not launched for sometime due to rain, Lu secretly suggested to Emperor Dezong that it was actually because Li Xilie was resentful of Yang and that Emperor Dezong should remove Yang to placate Li Xilie. Emperor Dezong agreed, and in fall 781, he made Yang Zuo Pushe (左僕射), one of the heads of the executive bureau, but no longer chancellor.

While Yang Yan was chancellor, he had demoted Yan Ying (嚴郢) the mayor of Jingzhao Municipality (京兆, i.e., the Chang'an region) because he disliked Yan Ying. Lu, knowing this, had Yan Ying made the chief imperial censor (御史大夫, Yushi Daifu). At Lu's direction, Yan Ying soon exposed an incident in which Yang had asked Zhao Huibo (趙惠伯) the mayor of Henan Municipality (河南, i.e., the Luoyang region) to sell Yang's mansion for him—and, at Yan's manipulation, this incident was increased in severity from the lesser charge of conflict of interest to embezzlement. Meanwhile, Lu also secretly told Emperor Dezong that Yang had built his family shrine on land that was said to be greatly blessed, and accused Yang of intending to try to become emperor himself. In winter 781, Emperor Dezong demoted and exiled Yang to the post of military advisor to the prefect of Yai Prefecture (崖州, in modern Sanya, Hainan). However, even before Yang reached Yai Prefecture, Emperor Dezong sent executioners to intercept and execute him.

== Notes and references ==
- Old Book of Tang, vol. 118.
- New Book of Tang, vol. 145.
- Zizhi Tongjian, vols. 225, 226, 227.
- A history of China from 7 BC to 1279
- Chinaknowledge.de article
- Article on foreign relations during the Tang dynasty
