= Li Gui =

Li Gui could refer to:

- Li Gui (warlord) (died 619), politician of the Sui dynasty who declared himself Emperor of Liang during the Sui–Tang transition
- Li Gui (prince) (750–783), Tang-dynasty prince
- Li gui (vessel), an inscribed bronze vessel from the early Zhou period
