= Li Miao (Tang dynasty) =

Li Miao (Chinese: 李邈; pinyin: Lǐ Miǎo; 746 – June 11, 773) was prince of the Tang dynasty. He was the second son of Emperor Daizong of Tang by his first wife Consort Cui.

It is not clear when he was born, but judging by his younger brother Li Jiong's date of birth it is speculated to be sometime between 746 and 750. Although Consort Cui was Daizong's first wife, she lost Daizong's favor after her clan was slaughtered during the An Lushan Rebellion.

Li Miao was known to be a studious and virtuous person. In 761, he was bestowed the title Prince of Yichang by his grandfather Emperor Suzong of Tang. In 762, he was bestowed the title Prince of Zheng by his father Daizong.

Li Miao died on June 11, 773.
