= Yang Wan =

Chinese historian, poet and politician

Yang Wan (Chinese: 楊綰; died August 27, 777), courtesy name Gongquan (公權), was a Chinese historian, poet, and politician during the Tang dynasty, serving briefly as chancellor during the reign of Emperor Daizong. He was known for his frugality, and it was said that his becoming chancellor caused a number of other officials to change their wasteful ways.

== Background ==
It is not known when Yang Wan was born, but it is known that his family was from Hua Prefecture (華州, in modern Weinan, Shaanxi). His family traced its ancestry to the Han dynasty official Yang Zhen (楊震) and a line that included a number of officials of Northern Wei. His granduncle Yang Zaisi served as a chancellor during the reign of Wu Zetian, and his grandfather Yang Wenyu (楊溫玉) was a prominent official at the time, receiving the title of Duke of Hucheng. His father Yang Kan (楊侃) served as a county magistrate during the Kaiyuan era (713–741) of Wu Zetian's grandson Emperor Xuanzong, and both Yang Wenyu and Yang Kan were known for their knowledge of Confucianism. Yang Wan lost his father early, and he served his mother with great filial piety. He was said to be quiet and studious, often spending his time in a small room with history books and maps.

== During Emperor Xuanzong's reign ==
Eventually, at the urging of his relatives and friends, Yang Wan stood for the imperial examinations and passed them, and he was made a scribe to Emperor Xuanzong's crown prince. In 754, on one occasion when Emperor Xuanzong ascended Qinzheng Tower (勤政樓), he ordered that the examinees who had passed the examinations be further offered four special examinations on that day – deep knowledge of the Confucian classics, understanding of Taoist writings, ability to write beautifully, and capability in military strategies – giving them one day to complete the examination. Yang was one of the three selected for writing beautiful poems, and he was promoted to be You Shiyi (右拾遺), a low-level official at the legislative bureau of government (中書省, Zhongshu Sheng).

== During Emperor Suzong's reign ==
In 755, the general An Lushan rebelled at Fanyang (范陽, in modern Beijing), and by summer 756, the forces of his new state of Yan were approaching the Tang capital Chang'an, forcing Emperor Xuanzong to flee to Chengdu. Emperor Xuanzong's son and crown prince Li Heng, however, did not follow him to Chengdu, but fled to Lingwu instead, where he was declared emperor (as Emperor Suzong). In the turmoil, despite great difficulty, Yang undertook the journey to join Emperor Suzong at Lingwu – at times resorting to begging for food – and once he reached Lingwu, Emperor Suzong made him the imperial archivist (起居舍人, Qiju Sheren) and put him in charge of drafting imperial edicts. He was eventually made Zhongshu Sheren (中書舍人), a mid-level official at the legislative bureau, and was in charge of editing the imperial history. There had been a custom at the legislative bureau that the most senior among the Zhongshu Sheren would receive special honors, and the 80% of the stipends given to them on the whole would be allocated to him. Yang was set to receive this special treatment, but he believed that as all of the Zhongshu Sheren had the same rank and responsibilities, the stipends should be divided equally, and he was much praised for this modesty.

== During Emperor Daizong's reign ==
By 763 – by which time Emperor Suzong had died and been succeeded by his son Emperor Daizong – Yang Wan was serving as the deputy minister of rites (禮部侍郎, Libu Shilang). He proposed a comprehensive reform of the Tang imperial examination system – believing that the two main examination types at the time, the Jinshi (進士) examination and the Mingjing (明經) examination, had both strayed off their original intents. In particular, as a result of poor choices in examination topics, the Jinshi examinees had become overly obsessed at writing ability, while the Mingjing examinees had become overly obsessed in trivia in the Confucian classics, without either type of examinees showing true abilities. He proposed that the examination system be returned to the Han dynasty type – that the examinees had to first be tested and recommended by county magistrates, and then by prefectural prefects; then, after they went through these two rungs and stood for imperial examinations at the capital, they were to be subjected to 20 questions on explaining the classics and three inquiries on special topics of state interest. He also advocated the abolition of the imperial examination on Taoism. Yang's proposal drew much debate, although it was ultimately rejected on the account that it was overly radical of a change to the examination system. However, in 764, when he proposed that two other special examinations – for those known for their devotion to family and for children under 10 who already were knowledgeable in one of the classics – be abolished, as they did not test true abilities either, Emperor Daizong agreed and abolished them. He was later made the deputy minister of civil service affairs (吏部侍郎, Libu Shilang), and was known for his fairness in selecting officials.

At that time, the most powerful chancellor at court was Yuan Zai, who was deeply trusted by Emperor Xuanzong and who had, through his use of power, drawn other officials to associate with him. Yang, however, would not associate with Yuan, and Yuan, wanting to remove Yang from his important post, acted as if he wanted to honor Yang for his reputation and for his seniority, made Yang the principal of the imperial university (國子祭酒, Guozi Jijiu) in 770 and replaced Yang with a corrupt associate, Xu Hao (徐浩). Eventually, Emperor Daizong made Yang, known for his frugality, the minister of worship (太常卿, Taichang Qing), hoping that he could help to change the wasteful customs among the officials at the time.

As the years went by, Yuan and his chancellor colleague Wang Jin became increasingly corrupt, and Emperor Daizong eventually tired of this. In 777, he had Yuan and Wang arrested; Yuan was executed, while Wang was exiled. He replaced them with Yang and Chang Gun — with Yang given the post of Zhongshu Shilang (中書侍郎, deputy head of the legislative bureau) and given the de facto chancellor designation of Tong Zhongshu Menxia Pingzhangshi (同中書門下平章事). It was said that the day that Yang was made chancellor, his reputation for frugality caused a change in his colleagues' behavior. In particular, the general Guo Ziyi reduced the musicians at his feasts by 80%; the official Li Gan (黎幹), who liked to have a large group of guards on horseback to accompany him, reduced his guards to 10; and the official Cui Kuan (崔寬) tore down his excessively large home. It was further said that Emperor Daizong intended to have Yang be in charge of correcting the corruption that permeated the imperial government at the time, but soon after Yang became chancellor, he suffered a stroke. His condition at one point got better, but he eventually died later in the year. Emperor Daizong was greatly saddened and was said to have told the officials, "Is it that Heaven does not wish for me to have peace in this realm that it took away Yang Wan this quickly?" The officials in charge of posthumous names proposed that he be given the posthumous name Wenjian (文簡, meaning "civil and undiscriminating"), which Emperor Daizong agreed. When an official jealous of Yang, Su Duan (蘇端), was induced by Chang (who was also jealous of Yang) to argue that that was an overly praiseful posthumous name, Emperor Daizong was enraged and exiled Su. Those who praised Yang for his frugality and his understanding of Buddhist and Taoist philosophical principles compared him to the Han dynasty officials Yan Zhen and Bing Ji (丙吉) and the Jin dynasty (266–420) officials Shan Tao and Xie An.

== Sources ==
- Old Book of Tang, vol. 119.
- New Book of Tang, vol. 142.
- Zizhi Tongjian, vols. 222, 223, 224, 225.
