= Li Shu (Tang dynasty) =

Lǐ Shù (李述) (740-791) was a Tang dynasty prince and Tang Daizong's fourth son. His mother's identity is unknown.

Judging by his younger brother Li Jiong's birth date, it's speculated that Li Shu was born between 746 and 750.

In 775 Li Shu was granted the title Prince of Mu (睦王) by his father Daizong.

Li Shu died in 791.
