= Chang Gun =

Chinese politician and writer

Chang Gun (常袞) (729–783), formally the Duke of He'nei (河內公), was a Chinese politician and writer during the Tang dynasty, serving as a chancellor during the reigns of Emperor Daizong and Emperor Dezong.

== Background ==
Chang Gun was born in 729, during the reign of Emperor Xuanzong. His family was from Jingzhao Municipality (京兆), which encompassed the Tang capital Chang'an. His great-grandfather Chang Xu (常緒), grandfather Chang Yi (常毅), and father Chang Wuwei (常無為) all served as minor officials. He had at least one older brother, Chang Jie (常皆).

Chang Gun himself passed the imperial examinations late in Emperor Xuanzong's Tianbao era (742-756). He initially served as a scribe for Emperor Xuanzong's crown prince Li Heng (the later Emperor Suzong), and later served as an imperial chronicler.

== During Emperor Daizong's reign ==
In 764, during the reign of Emperor Suzong's son Emperor Daizong, Chang Gun was made an imperial scholar and a reserve official at the ministry of civil service affairs (吏部, Libu), and also put in charge of drafting imperial edicts. In 765, he was made Zhongshu Sheren (中書舍人), a mid-level official at the legislative bureau of government (中書省, Zhongshu Sheng). Chang was said to be a capable writer, and both he and his colleague as Zhongshu Sheng, Yang Yan, were respected at the time and often discussed about together.

Chang was said to be honest and not associating with powerful individuals at court. At the time, the eunuch Yu Chao'en was extremely powerful, and at Yu's request, Emperor Daizong made Yu the acting principal of the imperial university, a move that Chang protested based on Yu's status as a eunuch notwithstanding Yu's power. He also advocated a curbing in the behavior of Huige soldiers who had been treated as guests in the Tang realm. (Huge armies had greatly assisted Tang in defeating the rebel state of Yan during the Anshi Rebellion). He further advocated that Emperor Daizong should decline elaborate birthday gifts that the regional governors were presenting to him or to Buddhist or Taoist temples in his honor, pointing out that these governors should have otherwise had no wealths of their own, and therefore these gifts must have come from pilfering from the people. Emperor Daizong was thankful for Chang's suggestions, but there was no indication on whether he accepted them. In 766, he was made the deputy minister of rites (禮部侍郎, Libu Shilang) and continued to be an imperial scholar. At that time, the eunuch Liu Zhongyi (劉忠翼) and the military governor Ma Lin (馬璘) were both trusted by Emperor Daizong and therefore were powerful. Both tried to intercede on their relatives' behalf so that the relatives could become imperial university students, but Chang rejected the intercessions.

In 777, Emperor Daizong, tired of corruption by long-time chancellors Yuan Zai and Wang Jin, executed Yuan and exiled Wang after having five officials, including Chang, Liu Yan, and Li Han (李涵), interrogate them. Emperor Daizong replaced Yuan and Wang with Chang and Yang Wan — in Chang's case, he was made Menxia Shilang (門下侍郎, the deputy head of the examination bureau (門下省, Menxia Sheng)) and given the de facto chancellor designation of Tong Zhongshu Menxia Pingzhangshi (同中書門下平章事). It was said that Chang paid attention to details and particularly wanted to stamp out any trace of corruption, while Yang had a more thorough view of the entire picture. It was also said that he was often guided by his own likes and dislikes. For example, as the officials' salaries were low at the time, he proposed an increase — but both he and Han Huang, who was in control of economic matters at the time, decided the scales by their own dislikes, and particularly set low salaries for two officials they disliked, Zhang Can (張參) and Zhao Ji (趙惎). Emperor Daizong trusted Yang more and gave him more responsibility, and Chang resented this. Yang died later in 777, however, and Chang effectively became the only chancellor in control of the government. Jealous of Yang, he encouraged the official Su Duan (蘇端) to propose a degradation of Yang's proposed posthumous name, a proposal that Emperor Daizong angrily rejected and exiled Su.

Solely in control of government, Chang set out to reform it in his vision. One of his first steps was to decline meals sent to the chancellors from the imperial kitchen, which had become customary during Yuan's and Wang's term as chancellor and which were enough for 10 people — an act that, however, drew parodies from other officials of the time that the meals were intended to reward the chancellors for their accomplishments, and that if he did not have accomplishments, he should decline the position, not the meal. The office of the chancellors (政事堂, Zhengshi Tang) was then within the legislative bureau, and customarily, the chancellors often went through a backdoor of the office of chancellors to visit the Zhongshu Sheren, who resided at the legislative bureau. Chang believed this showed partiality, and had the door sealed. During Yuan's term of office, much bribery was involved in the promotion of officers. Chang, in response, ordered that all promotions be strictly reviewed and particularly required literary talent for promotions. It was said that while Chang's reforms ended the era of bribery-influenced promotions, it also caused government work to grind to a halt.

Meanwhile, as there was no Zhongshu Ling (中書令, head of the legislative bureau) or Zhongshu Shilang (中書侍郎, deputy head of the legislative bureau), the senior Zhongshu Sheren Cui Youfu effectively ran the legislative bureau. Chang, pointing out that his responsibility as chancellor included responsibility to oversee the legislative bureau as well, took over the responsibilities from Cui and removed Cui's desk, drawing Cui's resentment. Chang tried to defuse it by putting Cui in charge of selecting officials at the ministry of civil service affairs, but they often ran into disputes as to which officials to select. In 778, there was an incident when the general Zhu Ci submitted what he thought to be a sign of fortune – a mouse living peacefully with a cat and her kittens. Chang considered this a sign of fortune and congratulated Emperor Daizong, but Cui, argued that this was against the cat's nature and was a sign that officials were not carrying out their responsibilities. Meanwhile, although Chang's position was important, he did not have an honorific title nor had he been given a creation, and so, at the urging of the general Guo Ziyi, Emperor Daizong created Chang the Duke of He'nei and gave him the honorific title Yinqing Guanglu Daifu (銀青光祿大夫).

== During Emperor Dezong's reign ==
Emperor Daizong died in 779 and was succeeded by his son Emperor Dezong. During Emperor Daizong's mourning period, Chang Gun and Cui Youfu got into a serious conflict over how many days the officials should wear mourning clothes. Chang advocated that because, by custom, Emperor Dezong was to wear mourning clothes for 27 days, so should the officials. Cui advocated that, because Emperor Daizong's will specify three days, the officials should wear the mourning clothes for three days. Chang got sufficiently angry over the argument that he submitted an accusation against Cui, stating that Cui had frivolously changed the proper regulation of the rites and requesting that Cui be demoted to be the prefect of Chao Prefecture (潮州, in modern Chaozhou, Guangdong). Emperor Dezong, believing the demotion to be too severe, only ordered that Cui be demoted to be the deputy mayor of Henan Municipality (河南), encompassing the eastern capital Luoyang.

However, it would be this article of accusation that would be Chang's downfall. Chang was effectively serving as the only chancellor at the time, but Guo Ziyi and Zhu Ci, due to their battlefield accomplishments, also carried chancellor titles but were not exercising chancellor authorities. Pursuant to the customs at the time, Chang, in the article of accusation, also signed Guo's and Zhu's names for them. Once the demotion of Cui was announced, however, Guo and Zhu both submitted defenses of Cui — surprising Emperor Dezong, who asked them why they had asked for Cui's demotion and then defended him; they responded that they did not know about the accusation. Emperor Dezong, who was not familiar with the customs that one chancellor should sign for other chancellors, believed Chang to have falsified Guo's and Zhu's signatures. He immediately ordered that Chang be demoted to be the prefect of Chao Prefecture and recalled Cui to serve as chancellor, although he still accepted Chang's proposal as to the mourning period.

Chang's friend Yang Yan later served as chancellor from 780 to 781. He had Chang promoted to be the governor (觀察使, Guancha Shi) of Fujian Circuit (福建, headquartered in modern Fuzhou, Fujian). It was said that the people of Fujian Circuit were not learned at the time, and when Chang arrived there, he built schools and had the people taught in the ways of literature and rites. Thereafter, there began to be people from Fujian Circuit who stood for imperial examinations whereas there had not been. He died in 783 while still serving at Fujian Circuit and was given posthumous honors. It was said that the people of Fujian would thereafter offer sacrifices to Chang and their teachers in the spring and the fall.

== Notes and references ==
- Old Book of Tang, vol. 119.
- New Book of Tang, vol. 150.
- Zizhi Tongjian, vols. 224, 225.
