= Pugu Huai'en =

General of the Chinese Tang dynasty

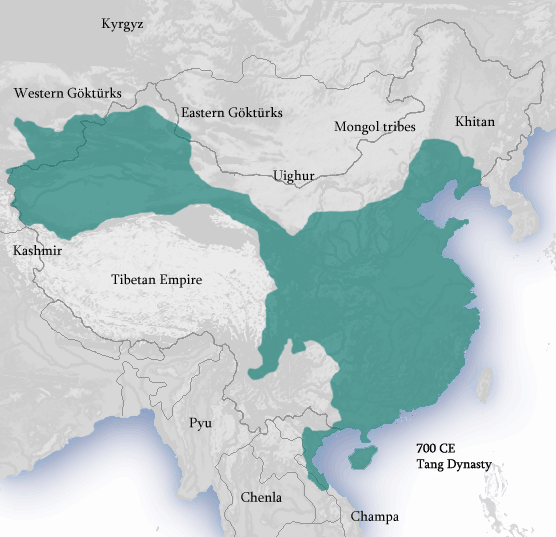
The Tang Dynasty around 700 C.E.

Pugu Huai'en (Chinese: 僕固懷恩) (died September 27, 765), formally the Prince of Da'ning (大寧王), was a Tiele-Chinese general of the Tang dynasty. He was instrumental in the final suppression of the Anshi Rebellion, but rebelled against Emperor Daizong in fear that he was being accused of treason. After an initial defeat by other Tang generals, he led his own forces, allied with forces of the Uyghur Khaganate and Tibetan Empire, to attack the Tang capital Chang'an, but died on the way.

== Background ==
It is not known when Pugu Huai'en was born. His grandfather Pugu Gelanbayan (僕固歌濫拔延) was a chieftain of the Pugu tribe, one of the nine major constituent tribes of the Tiele Confederation who submitted to Tang dynasty rule in 646, during the reign of Emperor Taizong. Emperor Taizong gave the nine chieftains titles as nine commandants, and Pugu Gelanbayan was made the commandant of Jinwei (金微). Pugu Huai'en's father Pugu Yilichuoba (僕固乙李啜拔) inherited the title as commandant of Jinwei, a post that Pugu Huai'en later inherited from him. During the Tianbao era (742-756) of Emperor Taizong's great-grandson Emperor Xuanzong, Pugu Huai'en was made a general and given the honorific title of Tejin (特進). He successively served under two military governors (jiedushi) of Shuofang Circuit (朔方, headquartered in modern Yinchuan, Ningxia), Wang Zhongsi and An Sishun, and both were impressed by his ferocity in battle and knowledge about the other non-Han tribes, as well as command skills, and so gave him great responsibility.

== During Anshi Rebellion ==
In 755, An Sishun's cousin An Lushan rebelled. An Sishun was recalled to the capital Chang'an and was succeeded by Guo Ziyi. Pugu Huai'en continued to serve under Guo, and when An Lushan sent his generals Gao Xiuyan (高秀巖) and Xue Zhongyi (薛忠義) to attack Shuofang, Pugu contributed in the victories against them. During the subsequent campaign that Guo and Li Guangbi conducted against territory held by An Lushan north of the Yellow River, Pugu contributed to a number of victories. However, subsequently, by summer 756, An Lushan had proclaimed himself the emperor of a new state of Yan, and his forces were approaching Chang'an after capturing Tong Pass, forcing Emperor Xuanzong and his crown prince Li Heng to flee. Emperor Xuanzong fled to Chengdu, but Li Heng fled to Lingwu (the headquarters of Shuofang Circuit) and was proclaimed emperor there (as Emperor Suzong). Guo subsequently returned to Lingwu to rendezvous with Emperor Suzong. At that time, there was a rebellion by the Tongluo (同羅) tribe of in the region, and Pugu was sent to battle the Tongluo forces. When his son Pugu Fen (僕固玢) was captured by Tongluo forces but subsequently escaped, Pugu Huai'en nevertheless executed him to make him an example to the army, and the army fought hard against the Tongluo subsequently and defeated them. Meanwhile, Emperor Suzong needed aid from Uyghur Khaganate, so he sent his second cousin Li Chengcai (李承寀) the Prince of Dunhuang and Pugu Huai'en to Uyghurs as emissaries to Uyghurs. Uyghurs' Bayanchur Khan gave a daughter to Li Chengcai in marriage, and returned him and Pugu with the proposal that he be allowed to marry a Tang princess. Emperor Suzong agreed, and gave Bayanchur Khan his daughter Princess Ningguo. Bayanchur Khan then sought to have his younger son Yaoluoge Yidijian (藥羅葛移地健) marry a Tang princess as well, and Emperor Suzong, rather than marrying another daughter to Yaoluoge Yidijian, decided to create Pugu's daughter a princess and marry her to Yaoluoge Yidijian, giving her the title Lesser Princess Ningguo.

Pugu subsequently returned to Guo's army and continued to serve under him. In early 757, Guo made an attempt to recapture Chang'an from the east, but was defeated at Tong Pass. Pugu was able to gather his forces and return east of the Yellow River. Subsequently, when Uyghurs aid forces arrived in fall 757, joint Tang and Uyghur forces made an assault against Chang'an, and Pugu and Li Siye had particularly great contributions in recapturing the capital. For his contributions, he was created the Duke of Feng.

With An Lushan having been assassinated by his own son An Qingxu early in 757, An Qingxu was the new emperor of Yan, and after Tang and Uyghur forces recaptured Chang'an, they recaptured Luoyang as well, forcing An Qingxu to flee to Yecheng. Nine Tang military governors put Yecheng under siege, and during the siege, Pugu continued to serve under Guo. When Shi Siming came to Yecheng's aid in summer 759, however, Tang forces collapsed, which the powerful eunuch Yu Chao'en blamed on Guo. Guo was thus recalled to the capital, and the command of his Shuofang army was transferred to Li Guangbi. The Shuofang soldiers, accustomed to Guo's lenience, were apprehensive of the strict Li Guangbi. The general Zhang Yongji (張用濟) thus planned to expel Li Guangbi and demand Guo's return, but was persuaded not to act by Pugu. When Li Guangbi later found out, he executed Zhang. Pugu was made Li Guangbi's deputy and created the Prince of Da'ning. Meanwhile, by that point, Bayanchur Khan had died and had been succeeded by Yaoluoge Yidijian, as Denli Khan, and so Pugu was honored by Uyghurs as well, as the queen's father. Subsequently, Shi killed An Qingxu and assumed the Yan throne, and then advanced south. Li Guangbi evacuated Luoyang and took up defense position at Heyang (河陽, near Luoyang), subsequently holding off Shi's planned advances toward Chang'an against multiple Yan attacks. In the Heyang campaign, both Pugu and his son Pugu Yang (僕固瑒) had much personal contributions. With Tang forces checking him at Heyang, Shi was not able to advance toward Chang'an for over a year. Pugu Huai'en was subsequently given the military governorship of Shuofang and given the command of the Shuofang troops.

It was said, however, that Pugu Huai'en was brave but overly aggressive, and that at times his command style was overly tolerant. Li Guangbi often curbed him in and punished his subordinates for wrongful behavior. Pugu thus feared and disliked Li Guangbi. In spring 761, this eventually turned into a disagreement where Pugu disagreed with Li Guangbi's strategy of holding at Heyang but rather advocated, along with Yu, that an effort should be made to recapture Luoyang. Emperor Suzong agreed, and ordered Li Guangbi to advance toward Luoyang with Pugu, Yu, and Wei Boyu (衛伯玉). Li Guangbi and Pugu, however, disagreed with to camp formation, with Li Guangbi wanting to put the camp in the hills and Pugu wanting to do so in the plains. Yan forces thus took advantage and launched a major attack on them, thoroughly routing Tang forces. All of the Tang generals, including Li Guangbi, Pugu, Yu, and Wei all fled. Li Baoyu, whom Li Guangbi had left at Heyang, also abandoned Heyang, and Heyang fell into Yan hands. (Soon after the Yan victory, however, Shi was assassinated and succeeded by his own son Shi Chaoyi, and Yan forces were unable to take advantage of the victory over Tang forces.)

In 762, Emperor Suzong died and was succeeded by his son Emperor Daizong. Emperor Daizong, upon his ascension, sent the eunuch Liu Qingtan (劉清潭) to Uyghur to seek aid against Yan—and yet, by this time, Shi Chaoyi had himself sent emissaries to Uyghur and persuaded Yaoluoge Yidijian to attack Tang with him instead. By the point that Liu arrived at the Uyghurs' headquarters, Uyghur forces had already advanced into Tang territory and were ready to attack. However, at this point, Yaoluoge Yidijian requested a meeting with Pugu Huai'en, and Emperor Daizong sent Pugu to meet with his daughter and brother-in-law. Pugu changed Yaoluoge Yidijian's mind, and he instead agreed to attack Yan with Tang forces. (During the meeting, however, Xin Yunjing (辛雲京), the military governor of Hedong Circuit (headquartered in modern Taiyuan, Shanxi), whose territory included the place of the meeting, fearing that Pugu and Yaoluoge Yidijian would attack him jointly, refused to meet with them and did not entertain them as host, leading eventually to an enmity between Pugu and Xin.) Pugu subsequently served as the deputy to the nominal commander, Emperor Daizong's oldest son Li Kuo the Prince of Yong, and led Tang forces in alliance with Uyghur forces, advancing toward Luoyang. Their forces, along with Tang forces commanded by Li Guangbi, Guo Ying'ai (郭英乂), Yu, and Li Baoyu, converged on Luoyang, defeating Shi Chaoyi and forcing him to flee.

Shi Chaoyi eventually committed suicide early in 763, ending the Anshi Rebellion. Several major Yan military governors, including Xue Song, Zhang Zhongzhi, Tian Chengsi, and Li Huaixian, surrendered to Tang with their forces. Instead of stripping their commands, however, Pugu had them resume command and stay at their current posts. (Pugu later justified this by stating that he was making sure that the rebellion is quelled and that these generals would not feel compelled to rebel again to preserve themselves; however, Li Baoyu and Xin, who were also involved in the operation of receiving these surrenders, felt differently, and believed that Pugu wanted to establish personal relationship with these generals to serve as allies and that Pugu was planning an eventual rebellion himself. Traditional historians generally took a middle view where they believed that Pugu was not planning a rebellion, but that he did want these generals as allies.) As a result of Pugu's contributions, Guo, who at that time carried the nominal title of deputy supreme commander over forces north of the Yellow River (with Li Kuo being the nominal supreme commander), offered to transfer the title to him, and Emperor Daizong did so, also giving Pugu the additional nominal titles as Pushe (僕射) and chancellor (as Zhongshu Ling (中書令)). In total 46 members of the Pugu clan sacrificed their lives fighting for Tang during the Anshi Rebellion.

== After Anshi Rebellion ==
Although Pugu Huai'en was the military governor of Shuofang, after the end of the Anshi Rebellion, he was stationed at Fen Prefecture (汾州, roughly modern Lüliang, Shanxi), with his son Pugu Yang and several other Shuofang generals under him, Li Guangyi (李光逸), Li Huaiguang, and Zhang Weiyue (張維嶽) stationed nearby. Meanwhile, after the end of the campaign, Emperor Daizong had Pugu Huai'en escort Yaoluoge Yidijian through Hedong Circuit back to Uyghur; as they went through Hedong Circuit, Xin Yunjing again refused to meet them and refused to entertain them as host. Pugu, in anger, submitted an accusation to Emperor Daizong, but Emperor Daizong took no action on it.

The matter came to a head in summer 763. The eunuch Luo Fengxian (駱奉仙), serving as Emperor Daizong's messenger, was visiting Taiyuan, the headquarters of Hedong Circuit. Xin bribed him and accused Pugu of planning to rebel, in association with Uyghur. As Luo was returning to Chang'an from Taiyuan, he went through Fen Prefecture. Pugu's mother threw a feast for him—during which she and Pugu both tried to endear Luo to them, but during which Pugu's mother also repeatedly complained how Luo was associating with Xin. During the feast, Pugu performed a dance to entertain Luo, and Luo gave him a gift. Pugu, in gratitude, asked Luo to stay an extra day to celebrate Duanwu Festival together. Luo declined and planned to leave, and Pugu, in order to show his sincerity, hid Luo's horse—but this caused Luo to be terrified, believing that Pugu was going to kill him, and so he escaped in the night. Pugu, shocked, had his guards chase Luo down and return his horse to him. Once Luo returned to Chang'an, he accused Pugu of planning to rebel, and Pugu submitted an accusation asking Emperor Daizong to execute Xin and Luo. Emperor Daizong took no actions on either accusation, but sent mildly-worded edicts to both sides.

Pugu, dissatisfied with Emperor Daizong's response, submitted a lengthy accusatory statement, complaining of a number of things:

1. That he had six great accomplishments that were being ignored—and, in doing so, he sarcastically referred to his contributions as "my crimes":
  1. Defeating the Tongluo;
  2. Killing his own son Pugu Fen in order to encourage the army;
  3. Marrying his daughters to Yaoluoge Yidijian;
  4. Fighting the rebels, along with his son Pugu Yang;
  5. Comforting the former rebel generals so that they would not rebel again; and
  6. Persuading Uyghur to quell the rebellion for Tang and escorting Uyghur troops out of Tang territory afterwards.
2. That the general Lai Tian (來瑱) had been wrongly executed earlier in 763 without a proper declaration of his crimes;
3. That the eunuchs, headed by Cheng Yuanzhen, were being overly powerful;
4. That the soldiers were not being adequately rewarded for their contributions.

He requested that Emperor Daizong send a special emissary to see him, and offered to go to Chang'an with that emissary to pay homage to Emperor Daizong. Emperor Daizong sent the chancellor Pei Zunqing to Fen Prefecture to meet with Pugu. When Pugu met with Pei, Pugu wept bitterly to complain of how he had been wrongly treated. Pei tried to persuade Pugu to go to Chang'an with him, and Pugu initially agreed, but changed his mind after his general Fan Zhicheng (范志誠) pointed out that he might suffer the same fate as Lai. Pei had to return to Chang'an without Pugu.

As of spring 764, Pugu was in a standoff with the imperial troops, but without open hostilities yet. At the suggestion of Yan Zhenqing and Lai Baoyu's cousin Li Baozhen (李抱真), Emperor Daizong publicly commissioned Guo Ziyi (who had been relieved of military commands for years but who earlier in the year had been put in charge of recapturing Chang'an after a Tibetan incursion briefly captured Chang'an and forced Emperor Daizong to flee) as the commander of Shuofang forces, hoping that the commission would cause Pugu's army to peel away from Pugu on its own. Meanwhile, Pugu, despite his mother's opposition, finally sent Pugu Yang to launch an attack on Taiyuan, but Pugu Yang was repelled by Xin. Subsequently, when Pugu Yang mishandled a dispute between Han and non-Han soldiers, the Han soldiers rose and killed him. When Pugu Huai'en reported Pugu Yang's death to his mother, his mother, angry that he had rebelled against the imperial government, tried to kill him, but Pugu escaped his mother's attack and fled with a small detachment to LIngwu, taking up position there. (Emperor Daizong subsequently welcomed Pugu Huai'en's mother to Chang'an and treated her with respect until her death later in the year.) The remaining Shuofang forces in the Fen Prefecture region all submitted to Guo.

Pugu regathered his strength once he took up position at Lingwu. Emperor Daizong, still hoping that Pugu would change his mind, treated Pugu's family members with respect, and further issued an edict praising Pugu for his contributions and maintaining his title as Prince of Da'ning, and further offering to promote him to be Taibao (太保, one of Sanshi (三師) -- honorific offices even higher than the Three Excellencies), but summoning him to Chang'an. Pugu refused. Meanwhile, news came that Pugu had entered into an alliance with Tibet and Uyghur and were planning to attack Chang'an. Emperor Daizong had Guo take up position at Fengtian (奉天, in modern Xianyang, Shaanxi) to defend against such potential attack. When Pugu, allied with Uyghur and Tibet, did attack in winter 764, Guo was able to repel it.

In fall 765, Pugu, Uyghur, and Tibet launched another attack on Chang'an, but Pugu died on September 27, blunting the attack. Guo subsequently persuaded the Uyghur forces to withdraw, and Tibetan forces, fearing a joint attack by Uyghur and Tang, also withdrew. Pugu's generals, including Pugu's nephew Pugu Mingchen (僕固名臣), largely submitted to Guo, ending the threat. Despite Pugu's rebellion, Emperor Daizong still remembered his contributions and mourned his death. Subsequently, after Pugu's older daughter died, Emperor Daizong created Pugu's younger daughter Princess Chonghui and married her to Yaoluoge Yidijian as well.
