= Li Xia =

Li Xia may refer to:

== People ==
- Li Xia (prince) (fl. 8th century), third son of Emperor Daizong of Tang
- Li Bai (spy) (1910–1949), alias Li Xia, spy for the Chinese Communist Party
- Xia Li (born 1988), Chinese wrestler

== Others ==
- Lixia, 7th solar term of the traditional Chinese lunisolar calendar
- Lixia District in Jinan, Shandong, China
- Western Xia (1038–1227), Tangut-led empire whose rulers adopted the Chinese surname Li
