= Yuan Zai =

Chinese economist, historian, judge and politician

Yuan Zai (元載) (713 – May 11, 777), courtesy name Gongfu (公輔), formally Duke Huang of Yingchuan (潁川荒公) and then Duke Chengzong of Yingchuan (潁川成縱公), Duke Zhong of Yingchuan (潁川忠公), was a Chinese economist, historian, judge, and politician during the Tang dynasty, serving as a chancellor during the reigns of Emperor Suzong and Emperor Daizong, becoming particularly powerful during the middle of Emperor Daizong's reign. He was said to be very capable as an official, but also treacherous and corrupt. His behavior eventually wore out Emperor Daizong's patience, and he was arrested and executed.

== Background ==
Yuan Zai was born in 713, and it was known that his family was from Qi Prefecture (岐州, in modern Baoji, Shaanxi). His father's name was originally (景昇). Jing Sheng became the property manager for Princess Yuan, the wife of Li Ming (李明) the Prince of Cao, a son of Emperor Taizong of Tang. He served her well, after asked for her, Jing Sheng changed his surname to Yuan. Yuan Zai lost his father early in life, and it was said that in his youth, he was studious and intelligent, and particularly well-studied in Taoist writings. He was so poor that he went to the local examinations (a prerequisite step to the imperial examinations) on foot, and he repeatedly failed to advance in the examinations.

== During Emperor Xuanzong's reign ==
Early in the Tianbao era (742–756) of Emperor Xuanzong, Emperor Xuanzong began to favor Taoism, and he scheduled a special examination for scholars well-versed in the Zhuangzi, Laozi, Liezi, and Wenzi. Yuan Zai did well on this special examination and was made the sheriff of Xinping County (新平, in modern Xianyang, Shaanxi). When the imperial censor Wei Yi (韋縊) was put in charge of selecting officials from Qianzhong Circuit (黔中, roughly modern Guizhou and western Hunan), he invited Yuan to serve as his assistant. After Yuan became better known, he was promoted to be Dali Pingshi (大理評事), a secretary at the supreme court (大理寺, Dali Si). Later, when the official Miao Jinqing served as the official in charge of the eastern capital Luoyang, he also invited Yuan to serve as his assistant. After that term of service, Yuan became Dali Sizhi (大理司直), a junior judge at the supreme court.

== During Emperor Suzong's reign ==
In 755, the general An Lushan rebelled at Fanyang Circuit (范陽, headquartered in modern Beijing) and established his own state of Yan, throwing the Tang realm into a state of war and confusion. Yuan Zai fled to the region south of the Yangtze River during the war. Li Xiyan (李希言), the surveyor of Jiangdong Circuit (江東, i.e., the region southeast of the Yangtze) commissioned Yuan as his deputy and the prefect of Hong Prefecture (洪州, in modern Nanchang, Jiangxi). After Emperor Xuanzong's son and successor Emperor Suzong recaptured the capital Chang'an and Luoyang from Yan forces, Yuan was recalled to the imperial government to serve as a junior official at the ministry of census (戶部, Hubu). When he met Emperor Suzong, Emperor Suzong was impressed by his quick thinking, and gave him several responsibilities—deputy minister of census (戶部侍郎, Hubu Shilang), deputy chief imperial censor (御史中丞, Yushi Zhongcheng), and the director of financial matters of the Yangtze-Huai River region. Believing that the Yangtze-Huai region was still comparably wealthy compared to the rest of the realm, Yuan taxed the region heavily to replenish the imperial treasuries, sometimes taxing as much as 80% to 90% of the people's assets, leading to much flight and banditry in the region.

Meanwhile, Yuan began a close association with the powerful eunuch Li Fuguo, through Li Fuguo's wife Lady Yuan, who was a clanswoman of Yuan Zai's. In 762, at Li Fuguo's recommendation, Yuan was named the mayor of the special municipality that included Chang'an, Jingzhao Municipality (京兆). Yuan then met Li Fuguo and earnestly declined the post—and Li Fuguo understood this to mean that he wanted an office higher than being the mayor of Jingzhao. The next day, when the chancellor Xiao Hua was removed from his office, Yuan was given the designation of Tong Zhongshu Menxia Pingzhangshi (同中書門下平章事), making him a chancellor de facto. He also continued to be in charge of financial matters.

== During Emperor Daizong's reign ==
Emperor Suzong died later that year, and after a bloody struggle between Emperor Suzong's wife Empress Zhang and Li Fuguo (in which Empress Zhang and a son of Emperor Suzong's, Li Xi (李係) the Prince of Yue, were killed), Emperor Suzong's son and crown prince Li Yu became emperor (as Emperor Daizong). For a while, Li Fuguo had even greater powerful than before. Yuan Zai continued to serve as chancellor and, knowing that Li Fuguo resented Xiao Hua (whom he blamed for blocking his path to chancellorship), Yuan made false accusations against Xiao, leading to Xiao's exile. Yuan was soon made Zhongshu Shilang (中書侍郎), the deputy head of the legislative bureau of government (中書省, Zhongshu Sheng), and continued to serve as chancellor. He was also created the Viscount of Xuchang. In 763, during a surprise attack by forces of the Tibetan Empire against Chang'an (which forced Emperor Daizong to flee to Shan Prefecture (陝州, in modern Sanmenxia, Henan), Emperor Daizong made the general Guo Ziyi the supreme commander of Tang forces in the Guanzhong region and made Yuan Guo's military advisor. When Emperor Daizong returned to Chang'an that year, the official Yan Zhenqing proposed that he offer sacrifices at the imperial ancestral tombs and temple first, before returning to the palace. Yuan refused to endorse Yan's proposal, and Yan, exasperated, stated, "How can you, lord chancellor, continue to harm the government?" This led Yuan to be resentful toward Yan. Meanwhile, when Emperor Daizong removed Miao Jinqing and Pei Zunqing from their chancellor posts after returning to Chang'an, it was said that Yuan became even more powerful. He bribed Emperor Daizong's eunuch attendant Dong Xiu (董秀) and had his subordinate Zhuo Yingqian (卓英倩) serve as a liaison to Dong. Through Dong and Zhuo, he was able to keep a close watch on what Emperor Daizong's opinions were and were able to agree with Emperor Daizong's opinions closely, thus drawing greater favor from the emperor. As he was finding the financial affairs too overwhelming for him to handle in addition to the chancellor duties, he transferred his financial affairs duties to his friend Liu Yan. It was said that by this point, Yuan was exceedingly powerful, and his wife Lady Wang (a daughter of the deceased general Wang Zhongsi) and his sons were abusing power. Meanwhile, though, with Li Fuguo (who was assassinated late in 762 by Emperor Daizong's orders, probably with Yuan's assistance) and Cheng Yuanzhen having successively been removed, Yu Chao'en had become a powerful eunuch, and he and Yuan did not get along with each other, and while the two did not openly dispute with each other, for the next several years, the power struggle between them would be a strong undercurrent in Tang court politics.

In 765, when the Tibetan Empire sent emissaries to propose peace with Tang, Emperor Daizong had Yuan and fellow chancellor Du Hongjian meet with them to swear peace.

In 766, with Yuan being very powerful and fearing that people would submit secret accusations to Emperor Daizong against him, he proposed that before officials could submit letters to the emperor, they must first receive approval from their superiors—thus hoping to cut off this avenue of secret submissions. Yan, then the minister of justice, vehemently opposed, pointing out that this would lead to the rise of another Li Linfu—who used similar methods to block off criticism against him during his service as Emperor Xuanzong's chancellor. Yuan, already resentful of Yan, accused Yan of defamation and had Yan exiled. Later that year, when Yu, during a lecture on the I Ching, tried to satirize the chancellors by talking about how a ding (a large cooking vessel often used to symbolize chancellorship) would overturn if imbalanced, Yuan's fellow chancellor Wang Jin, was visibly incensed, but Yuan remained calm and pleasant, leading Yu to comment, "It is common for the target to get angry, but one who remains smiling needs to be paid attention to even more carefully."

By 767, it was said that Emperor Daizong, Yuan, Wang, and Du were all devout in Buddhism, with Wang particularly so. With the emperor and the chancellors leading the way, the populace was also largely devoutly Buddhist—so much so that the energy of the government and the people were spent on worshiping, not on affairs of the state.

In 768, with the Tibetan Empire continuing to carry out incursions on a yearly basis, Yuan came up with a solution—as he believed that at that time, the only major army on the Tibetan border, commanded by the general Ma Lin (馬璘), was inadequate to defend against Tibetan attacks. He proposed that Ma's army be moved from Bin (邠州, in modern Xianyang) and Ning (寧州, in modern Qingyang, Gansu) to Jing Prefecture (涇州, in modern Pingliang, Gansu), while the stronger army under Guo's command, then at Hezhong (河中, in modern Yuncheng, Shanxi) be moved to Bin Prefecture. To alleviate fears that the border prefectures, then laid fallow by the wars with Tibetan forces, would be inadequate to supply this large army, Yuan committed to sending revenues from the interior prefectures to supply it. Meanwhile, he tried to sow seeds of suspicion between Guo and Yu, but was unable to do so.

In 769, with Du having died, Yuan recommended an old superior, the senior official Pei Mian, who had also recommended him before, to be chancellor. Pei, however, would die shortly after himself.

In 770, with Emperor Daizong's patience about Yu's hold on the imperial guards—with which Yu was able to dominate the Chang'an region—finally wearing thin, Yuan secretly conferred with Emperor Daizong and persuaded Emperor Daizong to act against Yu. Yuan bribed two close associates of Yu's—the guard commander Zhou Hao (周皓) and the general Huangfu Wen (皇甫溫)—and was able to get full grasp of Yu's activities. In spring 770, at Yuan's suggestion, Emperor Daizong carried out several moves that were intending to be preludes to eliminating Yu—moving the general Li Baoyu from being the military governor (jiedushi) of Fengxiang Circuit (鳳翔, headquartered in modern Baoji) to Shannan West Circuit (山南西道, headquartered in modern Xi'an, Shaanxi, to the southwest of Chang'an), while moving Huangfu, then the military governor of Shan Circuit (headquartered in modern Sanmenxia) to Fengxiang—while allaying Yu's suspicions by transferring control of four counties near Chang'an to the imperial guards, under Yu's command. (Yuan's intent was that, as Huangfu arrived in Chang'an, to use his soldiers against Yu.) Soon, when Huangfu arrived in Chang'an, Yuan laid a trap for Yu with Huangfu's and Zhou's soldiers, and at a secret meeting between Emperor Daizong and Yu, Yuan and Emperor Daizong acted and killed Yu.

After Yu's death, Yuan became even more powerful and corrupt. He also became extremely confident of his own abilities, and was living luxuriously, beyond his means. With Yang Wan the deputy minister of civil service affairs not willing to bow to his wishes in determining official commissions, he made Yang the principal of the imperial university and replaced him with a corrupt official, Xu Hao (徐浩), who followed his orders. Emperor Daizong by now had heard about Yuan's corruption, but wanted to maintain a good relationship with him. He therefore several times personally urged Yuan to curb his ways, but Yuan could not change his ways, beginning to cause him to lose Emperor Daizong's favor. In 771, Emperor Daizong, without seeking Yuan's concurrence and without foreknowledge on Yuan's part, named the official Li Qiyun (李栖筠) the chief imperial censor. It was said that this marked the beginning of the fall of Yuan's power. Indeed, in 773, after Li Qiyun indicted several of Yuan's associates—Xu Hao, Xue Yong (薛邕), Du Ji (杜濟), and Yu Shao (于劭) -- causing them to be demoted out of the capital, it was said that corruption became somewhat curbed at court.

Meanwhile, though, Yuan was working on another military project—proposing that Yuan Prefecture (原州, in modern Guyuan, Ningxia) -- formerly Tang territory, but now in a no-man's land between Tang and the Tibetan Empire, with neither side guarding it—be rebuilt; that Ma's forces be moved from Jing Prefecture to Yuan Prefecture; and that Guo's forces be moved from Bin Prefecture to Jing Prefecture; and that these posts then be used as bases of further forward advances against the Tibetan Empire. Emperor Daizong consulted with the general Tian Shen'gong (田神功) about this plan, and Tian responded, "Battling and judging the status of enemies is difficult even for well-seasoned generals. Why would Your Imperial Majesty listen to a civilian and put the entire realm's forces under his control?" Emperor Daizong thus tabled Yuan's proposal.

In 777, with Emperor Daizong finally tired of corruption on Yuan's and Wang Jin's part, he secretly planned with his uncle, the general Wu Cou (吳湊), to eliminate Yuan and Wang. On May 10, Emperor Daizong ordered Wu to arrest Yuan, Wang, and their associates. He then had Liu Yan, then the minister of civil service affairs, and Li Han (李涵) the chief imperial censor interrogate them. Yuan and Wang admitted their guilt, and Yuan was ordered to commit suicide, while Wang was exiled. Instead of committing suicide, Yuan stated to the executioner, "Please let me die quickly." The executioner responded, "Lord chancellor, if you wish to die quickly, then you have to suffer some humiliation. Please pardon me." The executioner took his socks off and stuffed them into Yuan's mouth, and then executed Yuan. Yuan's wife Lady Wang, as well as his sons Yuan Bohe (元伯和), Yuan Zhongwu (元仲武), and Yuan Ji'neng (元季能), were all executed. His family tombs and temples were destroyed, and his assets were confiscated. It was said that Yuan had large storages of pepper (then an exceedingly expensive spice) as well as gold, silver, and other treasures. Only his daughter Yuan Zhenyi (元真一), then already a Buddhist nun, was spared, but she was confiscated to be a servant inside the palace. (She was not told of her father's fate, and she did not find out until the reign of Emperor Daizong's son and successor Emperor Dezong.) A large number of Yuan's associates, including Yang Yan (whom Yuan had fostered as a potential successor), Han Hui (韓洄), Bao Ji (包佶), and Han Hui (韓會), were demoted. Yuan's title had been promoted to Duke of Yingchuan some-when before his death.

After Emperor Daizong died in 778 and was succeeded by Emperor Dezong, Emperor Dezong remembered that Yuan was involved in his being named crown prince. In 784, he posthumously restored Yuan's titles and offices and permitted him to be reburied properly. Yuan's subordinates Xu Chu (許初), Yang Jiao (楊皎), and Ji Tao (紀慆) paid out of their pockets to rebury Yuan. Yuan was also given the posthumous name of Huang (荒, meaning "performer of illegal acts"), later changed to the slightly less derogatory Chengzong (成縱, meaning "successful but unvirtuous"). During the reign of Emperor Wenzong of Tang, an official named Yan Houben (嚴厚本) suggested that the posthumous name of Yuan changed to Zhong (meaning "loyal"), insisting that despite his great corruption, Yuan had the great achievement of protecting Emperor Dezong when he was the Crown Prince of Emperor Daizong; and his suggestion was approved.

== Notes and references ==
- Old Book of Tang, vol. 118.
- New Book of Tang, vol. 145.
- Zizhi Tongjian, vols. 222, 223, 224, 225.
