= Li Gou =

Tang dynasty prince (c.750–809)

Lǐ Gòu (李遘) (750? – January 30, 809) was a Tang dynasty prince and Tang Daizong's eighth son. His mother's identity is unknown.

In the year 775 Li Gou became Prince of Fu (鄜王) and in 783 was awarded the title Prince of Jian (簡王) by his elder brother and emperor Tang Dezong.

In the year 809 Li Gou died.
