= Li Xia (prince) =

Lǐ Xiá (李遐) was a Tang dynasty prince and Tang Daizong's third son. His mother's identity is unknown. His birth date is also unknown, but judging by his brother Li Jiong's status as seventh son, it should be sometime between 746 and 750.

He died prematurely and was conferred the posthumous title of Prince of Jun (均王) by his elder brother and emperor Tang Dezong.
