= Li Baoyu =

Sogdian general of the Chinese Tang dynasty

Duke Zhaowu of Liang (涼昭武公) Li Baoyu
- 李抱玉
- Modern portrait of Li Baoyu

Personal details
- Born: 703 Wuwei, Hexi (Gansu)
- Died: April 15, 777 (aged 73–74) Tufan frontier

Military service
- Battles/wars: An Lushan Rebellion

Li Baoyu (Chinese: 李抱玉) (703 – April 15, 777), né An Chongzhang (安重璋), known for some time as An Baoyu (安抱玉), formally Duke Zhaowu of Liang (涼昭武公), was a Sogdian-Chinese general of the Tang dynasty. He was known for his contributions to Tang during the Anshi Rebellion and for his subsequent defense of the western border against Tufan.

== Background ==
An Chongzhang was born in 703, during the reign of Wu Zetian. He was an ethnic Sogdian. His family was originally from Parthia but had lived for generations in the Hexi region, and his great-grandfather An Xinggui (安興貴) was a contributor to Tang dynasty's establishment, having overthrown one of the contenders for supremacy during the transition from Sui to Tang, Li Gui the Emperor of Liang and united Li Gui's Liang state to Tang. The An family was known for its capability in tending horses, and a number of An family members moved to the region around the Tang capital Chang'an and became students of literature, having intermarried with scholar-bureaucratic families. An Chongzhang, however, grew up in the western regions and was capable in horsemanship and archery. He started serving in the military early in his life, and was said to be full of tactics, careful, and faithful. Toward the end of the Tianbao era (742–756) of Wu Zetian's grandson Emperor Xuanzong, for An Chongzhang's accomplishments in the army, Emperor Xuanzong bestowed on him a new name—Baoyu (meaning, "one who holds jade"). At the time that the general An Lushan rebelled at Fanyang (范陽, in modern Beijing) in 755 and soon established a new state of Yan, An Baoyu was defending Nanyang (南陽). When An Lushan sent messengers to try to persuade him to submit to Yan, he killed An Lushan's messengers.

== During Emperor Suzong's reign ==
In 756, Yan forces approached Chang'an, forcing Emperor Xuanzong to flee to Chengdu. Emperor Xuanzong's son and crown prince Li Heng did not follow him to Chengdu, but instead fled to Lingwu, where he was declared emperor (as Emperor Suzong)—an act that Emperor Xuanzong later recognized. One of the major generals that Emperor Suzong employed in the war against Yan was Li Guangbi, and Li Guangbi invited An Baoyu to serve under him. In 757, An Baoyu petitioned Emperor Suzong for a name change—stating, "Your subject has lived in Liang Prefecture for generations. I am ashamed to bear the same surname as the rebellious subject." Emperor Suzong granted him the imperial surname of Li, and also permitted him to change his designated home to Chang'an—considered a substantial honor at the time. This was applied retroactively to his Sogdian ancestors as well, all of whom would be referred with the surname Li instead of An.

Li Baoyu was also made the military governor (jiedushi) of Chenzheng Circuit (陳鄭, headquartered in modern Zhengzhou, Henan). Later in the year, when the new Yan emperor Shi Siming captured Luoyang (which, along with Chang'an, had been recaptured by Tang forces in 757), at Li Guangbi's request, Li Baoyu defended the southern fort at the important strategic position Heyang (河陽, near Luoyang) while Li Guangbi himself defended the central fort. Li Baoyu defended the southern fort despite an overwhelming Yan siege and eventually, Tang forces were able to stop the Yan advance. For Li Baoyu's contributions, he was created the Duke of Lecheng. In 761, however, when the eunuch official Yu Chao'en pressured Li Guangbi into trying to recapture Luoyang – which ended in spectacular failure—Li Baoyu was also forced to abandon Heyang and flee, apparently to Ze Prefecture (澤州, in modern Jincheng, Shanxi), for in 762, that was the location that Shi Siming's son and successor Shi Chaoyi put Li Baoyu under siege, which was lifted when the major general Guo Ziyi sent the Dingguo Army (定國軍) to aid him, allowing Li Baoyu to turn the tables on the Yan forces and defeat them.

== During Emperor Daizong's reign ==
Emperor Suzong died later in 762 and was succeeded by his son Emperor Daizong. Emperor Daizong made Li Baoyu, in addition to Chenzheng Circuit, the military governor of Zelu Circuit (澤潞, headquartered in modern Changzhi, Shanxi), where Li Baoyu was at the time. He also wanted to create Li Baoyu the Prince of Wuwei, but Li Baoyu earnestly declined the princely title; instead, Emperor Daizong created him the Duke of Liang and gave him the honorific title of Sikong (司空)—one of the Three Excellencies. Later in 762, Li Baoyu participated in the joint Tang and Huige campaign to recapture Luoyang, and after Luoyang fell and Shi Chaoyi fled, a number of Yan generals submitted to Tang—but then were permitted to remain at their posts by the major Tang general Pugu Huai'en. Li Baoyu and another Tang general, Xin Yunjing (辛雲京), thus suspected Pugu of planning to rebel and warned Emperor Daizong of such. (Pugu was in fact fearful that the imperial government would no longer consider him important and therefore planned an alliance with these former Yan generals, and did eventually rebel in 763. His rebellion would not dissipate until his death in 765.)

In 763, Tufan forces made a surprise attack on Chang'an and captured it, forcing Emperor Daizong to flee to Shan Prefecture (陝州, in modern Sanmenxia, Henan). Although Emperor Daizong was able to return to Chang'an soon thereafter, in the aftermaths, absconding Tang soldiers and local bandits grouped together in the five valleys to the south of Chang'an and engaged in banditry that Tang local governments were unable to deal with. Emperor Daizong initially put the official Xue Jingxian (薛景仙) in charge of suppressing the bandits, but Xue was unable to successfully do so even after several months. In 764, Emperor Daizong gave Li Baoyu the additional responsibility of being the military governor of Fengxiang Circuit (鳳翔, headquartered in modern Baoji, Shaanxi) and put him in charge of the operations against the bandits. Li Baoyu used scouts to first discover the hidden headquarters of the bandits' leader Gao Yu (高玉) and was thereafter able to capture Gao by a surprise attack commanded by his subordinate Li Chongke (李崇客). It was said that within days, the banditry ceased. Also in 764, with another Tufan attack appearing to be looming, Emperor Daizong put Li Baoyu, along with Guo, in charge of defending against the Tufan forces. In light of Li Baoyu's being stationed at Fengxiang, Emperor Daizong made Li Baoyu's cousin Li Baozhen the deputy military governor of Zelu, and thereafter, while Li Baoyu was still titularly the military governor of Zelu, Li Baozhen was in actual command. In 765, when, near the end of Pugu's rebellion, a joint Huige and Tufan force that was intending to aid Pugu approached Chang'an, Li Baoyu was one of the generals who were summoned to defend Chang'an. (After Pugu died of illness around that time, Guo was able to persuade Huige forces to withdraw, and once Huige forces did so, so did Tufan forces.)

In 767, Li Baoyu went to Chang'an to pay homage to Emperor Daizong. He offered to resign one of his honorary titles—Zuo Pushe (左僕射, which, if not honorary, would be one of the heads of the executive bureau of government (尚書省, Shangshu Sheng)). Emperor Daizong agreed, although when Li Baoyu then also offered to resign the command of Fengxiang Circuit, Emperor Daizong refused.

In 770, as part of Emperor Daizong's plot with the chancellor Yuan Zai to kill Yu Chao'en, who had by then become overbearingly powerful, Yuan's ally Huangfu Wen (皇甫溫) was moved from Shan Circuit (headquartered in modern Sanmenxia) to Fengxiang, while Li Baoyu was moved from Fengxiang to Shannan West Circuit (山南西道, headquartered in modern Xi'an, Shaanxi, to the southwest of Chang'an). When Li Baoyu was embarking from Fengxiang, heading for Shannan West's capital Zhouzhi (盩厔), it was said that his soldiers were so angry about the movement that they pillaged Fengxiang for several days. After Emperor Daizong and Yuan killed Yu soon thereafter, Huangfu was moved back to Shan and it appeared that Fengxiang was given back to Li Baoyu. Later in the year, when Ma Lin (馬璘) the military governor of Jingyuan Circuit (涇原, headquartered in modern Pingliang, Gansu) complained that his circuit was too poor to support his army, Emperor Daizong hinted to Li Baoyu that he should yield two prefectures out of his command—Zheng Prefecture (鄭州, in modern Zhengzhou) and Ying Prefecture (潁州, in modern Xuchang, Henan)—and Li Baoyu did so; those prefectures were thereafter transferred to Ma.

In 771, Li Baoyu submitted a petition to Emperor Daizong, asking for part of his responsibility area to be given to another general—pointing out that given how much of the Tufan frontier was in his responsibility area, if Tufan attacked multiple places, he would not be able to defend against all of the Tufan attacks. He offered to yield the command of Shannan West. Emperor Daizong was appreciative of Li Baoyu's willingness to yield, and agreed to do so, although there was no subsequent records of Emperor Daizong giving Shannan West to another general. In 775, when Tufan made further incursions, Li Baoyu defended against the attack. He died in 777. He was much mourned by Emperor Daizong and given posthumous honors.

Li Baoyu's biography in the Old Book of Tang contained this commentary about him:

Li Baoyu defended Fengxiang for more than a decade. While he did not have the accomplishment of defeating the barbarians, he prohibited violence and comforted the people, and he was much praised by his contemporaries.

== Notes and references ==
- Old Book of Tang, vol. 132.
- New Book of Tang, vol. 138.
- Zizhi Tongjian, vols. 221, 222, 223, 224, 225.
