= Yu Daniang =

Chinese businessperson

Yu Daniang (俞大娘,"Aunt Yu") was a Chinese businessperson, who lived during the Tang dynasty. During the reign of Emperor Daizong of Tang, she operated a major shipbuilding business, who manufactured and sold boats to the rich and powerful. They were called "Yu Daniang boats" (俞大娘航船) after her. It was not uncommon for women to manage major businesses at the time. In China, commercial activities had a low status at the time. She is known as one of the most notable businesswomen in China prior to the modern age alongside Widow Qing.
