= Li Xuan (Tang prince) =

Tang dynasty prince

Li Xuan (Chinese: 李選) was a prince of the Chinese Tang dynasty. He was the eleventh son of the Emperor Daizong of Tang. His mother's identity is unknown.

Li Xuan died early.

In 781, he was posthumously accorded the noble title of Prince of Jing (荊王) by his brother, the Emperor Dezong of Tang.
