= Du Hongjian =

Chinese Buddhist monk and politician

Du Hongjian (杜鴻漸; 709 – December 13, 769), courtesy name Zhisun (之巽), formally Duke Wenxian of Wei (衛文憲公), was a Chinese Buddhist monk and politician during the Tang dynasty who served as a chancellor during the reign of Emperor Daizong. He was known, and much criticized by traditional Chinese historians, for his devotion to Buddhism, one manifestation of which was his patronage of the Chan master Wuzhu.

== Background ==
Du Hongjian was born in 709, during the second reign of Emperor Zhongzong. His family was from Pu Prefecture (濮州, roughly modern Heze, Shandong) and claimed its ancestry from the Qin dynasty general Du He (杜赫), and traced itself to a line of officials during the Northern Wei, Northern Qi, Sui dynasty, and Tang dynasty. It was said that the clan's members were on such good terms that it did not divide for five generations down to Du Xian. Both Du Hongjian's great-grandfather Du Yikuan (杜義寬) and grandfather Du Chengzhi (杜承志) were low level officials. His father Du Pengju (杜鵬舉) served as a prefectural prefect and was known for his knowledge as a physician—knowledge he learned because his mother was frequently ill—in addition to being an official. Du Pengju's cousin Du Xian served as a chancellor during the reign of Emperor Zhongzong's nephew Emperor Xuanzong. Du Hongjian had at least one older brother, Du Lingyuan (杜靈瑗).

Du Hongjian himself was said to be intelligent and studious. After he passed the imperial examination, he was made a military advisor to Emperor Xuanzong's son Li Bin (李玢) the Prince of Yan. Later, at the request of An Sishun, the military governor (Jiedushi) of Shuofang Circuit (朔方, headquartered in modern Yinchuan, Ningxia), he became An's secretary.

== Support of Li Heng as emperor ==
In 755, the general An Lushan (An Sishun's stepbrother) rebelled at Fanyang (范陽, in modern Beijing), and by summer 756, the forces of his new state of Yan were approaching the Tang capital Chang'an, forcing Emperor Xuanzong to flee to Chengdu. Emperor Xuanzong's son and crown prince Li Heng, however, did not follow him to Chengdu, but instead considered fleeing to Lingwu (Shuofang Circuit's capital); for the time being, he remained at Pingliang. Meanwhile, with the new circuit military governor Guo Ziyi in the east fighting Yan forces, Du Hongjian was serving as acting military governor at Lingwu, and he conferred with the other key circuit officials—Lu Shaoyou (陸少遊), Cui Yi (崔漪), Lu Jianjin (盧簡金), and Li Han (李涵)—and decided to welcome Li Heng to Lingwu. Li Han thus went to Pingliang and met with Li Heng, who agreed. Du and Cui went south to escort Li Heng to Lingwu, while leaving Wei at Lingwu to prepare for Li Heng's arrival. Once they rendezvoused with Li Heng, they returned to Lingwu with Li Heng.

Once they arrived in Lingwu, Du and another imperial official who had accompanied Li Heng, Pei Mian, advocated that Li Heng should take the throne in light of the emergency the empire was facing. Li Heng agreed, and he was declared emperor (as Emperor Suzong)—an act that Emperor Xuanzong later recognized. He made Du Zhongshu Sheren (中書舍人), a mid-level official at the legislative bureau of government (中書省) and soon made him the deputy minister of defense (武部侍郎, Wubu Shilang).

== During Emperor Suzong's reign ==
In 757, Emperor Suzong made Du Hongjian the military governor of Hexi Circuit (河西, headquartered in modern Wuwei, Gansu). Later in the year, after joint Tang and Huige forces recaptured Chang'an and the eastern capital Luoyang, Emperor Suzong made Du the military governor of Jingnan Circuit (荊南, headquartered in modern Jingzhou, Hubei). In 759, after the Xiang Prefecture (襄州, in modern Xiangfan, Hubei) army officers Kang Chuyuan (康楚元) and Zhang Jiayan (張嘉延) rebelled and attacked Jingnan's capital Jing Prefecture, Du abandoned Jing Prefecture and fled. As a result, the surrounding prefectures were thrown into panic, and the officials from five surrounding prefectures also fled their posts, into the valleys. The rebellion was eventually put down later in the year by Wei Lun (韋倫) the prefect of Shang Prefecture (商州, in modern Shangluo, Shaanxi). After about a year, Du was recalled to the imperial government to serve as Shangshu You Cheng (尚書右丞, one of the secretaries in general of the executive bureau (尚書省, Shangshu Sheng)), deputy minister of civil service affairs (吏部侍郎, Libu Shilang), and minister of worship (太常卿, Taichang Qing).

== During Emperor Daizong's reign ==
In 762, both Emperor Xuanzong (then Taishang Huang (retired emperor)) and Emperor Suzong died in rapid succession, and Emperor Suzong's son Emperor Daizong took the throne. Du Hongjian was put in charge of the burials of Emperors Xuanzong and Suzong. After the two emperors were buried, he was given the honorific title of Guanglu Daifu (光祿大夫) and created the Duke of Wei. In 764, Emperor Daizong made him the deputy minister of defense again (now with the title Bingbu Shilang (兵部侍郎)) and gave him the designation Tong Zhongshu Menxia Pingzhangshi (同中書門下平章事), making him a chancellor de facto. He was soon also made Zhongshu Shilang (中書侍郎), the deputy head of the legislative bureau. In 765, when Emperor Daizong entered into a peace treaty with Tufan, he had Du and fellow chancellor Yuan Zai sign the treaty with the Tufan emissary.

In 766, after Xichuan Circuit (西川, headquartered in modern Chengdu) was thrown into a state of civil war after the military governor Guo Ying'ai (郭英乂) was killed by the military officer Cui Gan and several other military officers—Bo Maolin (柏茂琳), Yang Zilin (楊子琳), and Li Changkui (李昌夔)—rose to resist Cui, Emperor Daizong made Du the military governor of Xichuan as well as the deputy supreme commander of the region, to try to calm the circuit. On the way, though, Du heard that the military governor of Shannan West Circuit (山南西道, headquartered in modern Hanzhong, Shaanxi), Zhang Xiancheng (張獻誠), had been defeated by Cui, and was afraid to advance. He sent messengers to make overtures to Cui, who acted as respectfully as possible and offered bribes to Du. When Du arrived at Chengdu, Cui treated him with the utmost formal respect but did not permit him any actual control over the governance. In response, Du repeatedly recommended to Emperor Daizong to let Cui become military governor while placating Bo, Yang, and Li Changkui by making them prefects of their prefectures. Emperor Daizong reluctantly agreed, although he initially made Cui only the mayor of Chengdu Municipality and the military commander, under Du. In 767, Du requested to return to Chang'an. Emperor Daizong agreed, and he made Cui the military governor and let Du resume his service as chancellor and made Cui the military governor—an action for which the people of the time criticized Du for, believing that he was encouraging rebellion. Upon his return to Chang'an, Du, a devout Buddhist, offered thanks to the Buddha by holding a vegetarian feast for over 1,000 Buddhist monks. Meanwhile, it was said that because Du and his chancellor colleagues Yuan and Wang Jin were all devout Buddhists, Emperor Daizong and the other officials were all influenced by them to become devout Buddhists as well.

In 769, Emperor Daizong wanted to put Du in charge of Luoyang, to replace Wang. Du declined, citing an illness, and was allowed not to go to Luoyang. He further resigned his other posts, including chancellor post, late in 769，which was approved on 10 December; he died three days later. Prior to his death, he undertook tonsure and formally became a Buddhist monk, and by his will was cremated with his ashes placed in a tower, pursuant to Buddhist customs, rather than buried in the ground per Chinese customs of the time, and was much criticized by popular opinions of the time. He was awarded posthumous honors.

Liu Xu, the lead editor of the Old Book of Tang, commented about Du:

Du Hongjian had the achievement of preserving the state but was not capable of defending cities. However, I disagree with the criticism at the time of how he had commissioned Cui Gan. At that time, Cui was able to resist Bo Zhenjie to the south and defeat Zhang Xiancheng to the north. He needed to be dealt with in finesse, not by power. That Cui eventually paid allegiance to the empire was indeed by Du's strategy; if Du had attacked him, he would have been a serious bandit to deal with. However, his worship of the Buddha to seek good fortune and his associations with others to foster his power are no ways for a gentleman to act.
