= Li Xun (Tang dynasty) =

Lǐ Xùn (李迅) (750? - 784) was a Tang dynasty prince and Tang Daizong's tenth son. His mother's identity is unknown.

In 775 he awarded the title Prince of Sui (隋王) by his father but did not become a jiedushi.

He died in 784.
