= Yu Chao'en =

Chinese eunuch, military general, and politician (722–770)

Yu Chao'en (魚朝恩; 722 – April 10, 770), formally the Duke of Han (韓公), was a Chinese eunuch, military general, and politician during the Tang dynasty. He was powerful early during the reign of Emperor Daizong and was feared by others, including chancellors. At the urging of the chancellor Yuan Zai, Emperor Daizong secretly executed him at a meeting in 770, although Emperor Daizong publicly claimed that he committed suicide.

== Background ==
Yu Chao'en was born in 722, during the reign of Emperor Xuanzong. His family was from Lu Prefecture (瀘州, in modern Luzhou, Sichuan). Late in Emperor Xuanzong's Tianbao (742–756) era, Yu was an eunuch attached to the examination bureau of government (門下省, Menxia Sheng). It was said that he was intelligent and was capable both in publicly announcing imperial edicts and in accounting.

== During Emperor Suzong's reign ==
Early in the Zhide (756–758) era of Emperor Xuanzong's son and successor Emperor Suzong, during which Emperor Suzong was occupied with trying to suppress the rebel state Yan, Yu Chao'en was often commissioned to serve as a monitor of the armies, including serving as monitor of the army of Li Guangjin (李光進) during the recapturing of the capital Chang'an from Yan forces in 757. For his contributions to the campaign, he was put in charge of the eunuch bureau (內侍省, Neishi Sheng) and given a general title. Subsequently, after Tang forces recaptured the eastern capital Luoyang (which served as Yan's capital), forcing the Yan emperor An Qingxu to flee to Yecheng, nine Tang military governors (jiedushi) put Yecheng under siege. The two most prominent generals of the nine were Guo Ziyi and Li Guangbi (Li Guangjin's brother), and as Emperor Suzong did not want to force one to submit to the command of the other, he did not commission a supreme commander; rather, he made Yu the monitor of the armies. It was said that Yu was jealous of Guo and often submitted reports criticizing Guo, but that Guo defused the tension by being humble with Yu.

In 759, the Yan general Shi Siming, who had briefly submitted to Tang but then rose again against Tang, attacked Tang forces at Yecheng and, while not achieving a victory, caused the Tang forces to collapse by themselves. He subsequently killed An Qingxu and took over the Yan throne. Meanwhile, Yu blamed the collapse on Guo, and as a result, Li Guangbi was put in command of the armies. Shi Siming subsequently attacked Luoyang and captured it. After a failed attempt by Tang forces to capture Luoyang, instigated by Yu and opposed by Li Guangbi, Shi tried to attack west toward Chang'an, but was repelled by the general Wei Boyu (衛伯玉), who was under Yu's command, at Shan Prefecture (陝州, in modern Sanmenxia, Henan). After a joint Tang and Huige army recaptured Luoyang in 762, Yu stationed his elite Shence Army to Bian Prefecture (汴州, in modern Kaifeng, Henan). For his contributions in this battle, he was created the Duke of Fengyi. Later in 762, he moved back to Shan Prefecture.

== During Emperor Daizong's reign ==
Also in 762, Emperor Suzong died and was succeeded by his son Emperor Daizong. In 763, when the Tibetan Empire launched a sudden attack against Chang'an, Emperor Daizong was forced to flee to Shan Prefecture. When he fled, very few imperial guard soldiers accompanied him, and it was not until Yu Chao'en met him at Huayin (華陰, in modern Weinan, Shaanxi) that he was protected by an army. Emperor Daizong gave Yu the title of monitor of troops over the entire realm (天下觀軍容宣慰處置使, Tianxia Guanjunrong Xuanwei Chuzhishi). After Emperor Xuanzong's return to Chang'an later in the year, Yu continued to be in command of the Shence Army and was greatly favored by Emperor Daizong, receiving much wealth. He was also permitted to enter and leave the palace as he wished. As the generals under his command continued to achieve important victories, particularly in the subsequent conflict against the rebellious general Pugu Huai'en, he considered himself capable in military command. As he considered himself learned in the Confucian classics as well and was capable of writing. In 765, during an attack by Pugu's forces, aligned with the Uyghur Khaganate and the Tibetan Empire, Yu tried to use his soldiers to coerce the imperial officials into concurring with moving the capital to Hezhong (河中, in modern Yuncheng, Shanxi), but when an official named Liu publicly denounced the plan even with Yu's soldiers surrounding him, Yu abandoned the plan.

Also in 765, Yu, because he believed himself capable in literary matters, was made the acting principal of the imperial university (國子監, Guozijian). He was also created the Duke of Zheng. Under him, the imperial university, which had been destroyed during the An Lushan Rebellion, was rebuilt. In 766, when the university's construction was completed, Yu personally lectured about the I Ching, tried to satirize the chancellors by talking about how a ding (a large cooking vessel often used to symbolize chancellorship) would overturn if imbalanced. The chancellor Wang Jin, was visibly incensed, but the more powerful Yuan Zai remained calm and pleasant, leading Yu to comment, "It is common for the target to get angry, but one who remains smiling needs to be paid attention to even more carefully." Yuan, however, was secretly resentful. Yu continued to be the principal of the university until 768, despite opposition by the official Chang Gun that a eunuch should not head the university.

In 767, Yu donated his mansion outside Chang'an to be rebuilt into a Buddhist temple dedicated to Emperor Daizong's deceased mother Consort Wu. As she was posthumously honored Empress Zhangjing, the temple was named Zhangjing Temple. The temple was said to be so luxuriously built that the wood in Chang'an was not enough, and several imperial pavilions had to be torn down so that the wood could be reused, and many officials and generals were required to donate their own houses for wood. In 768, he was created the Duke of Han. That year, at the anniversary of Consort Wu's death, Yu held a feast in her honor—at which he openly talked about how the chancellors were incompetent and should yield their seats. The chancellors did not dare to respond, but the junior officials Xiangli Zao (相里造) and Li Kan (李衎) responded and rebuked Yu, causing him to be displeased and to adjourn the feast early. Late in the year, Guo Ziyi's father's tomb was opened by grave robbers, but it was commonly believed that, because Yu disliked Guo immensely, that he was responsible for instigating it, and thus, when Guo subsequently arrived in the capital, there was anticipation that Guo would react violently. Guo defused the tension by stating that his soldiers have themselves robbed many graves, and that this must have been divine retribution. In 769, when Emperor Daizong had Yu escort Guo on a tour of Zhangjing Temple, Yuan tried to exploit the tension between the two by having Guo's subordinates falsely warning Guo that Yu was set to kill him during the tour. Guo refused to take precautions and told Yu about the rumors, defusing the tension between the two.

Meanwhile, several things caused Emperor Daizong to begin to be pleased with Yu. Yu was beginning to expect Emperor Daizong to accept every suggestion of his, and on one occasion, when Emperor Daizong did not, Yu stated, "Is there anything in this realm that I cannot decide?" Yu's young adoptive son Yu Linghui (魚令徽) was then serving as a eunuch inside the palace, and he wore the green robe for sixth and seventh rank officials. On an occasion, he had an argument with his colleagues, and he told Yu Chao'en about the argument. Yu Chao'en met Emperor Daizong the next day and stated, "My son's rank is too low, and his colleagues look down on him. Please let him wear a purple robe." Even before Emperor Daizong could respond, the officials nearby, following Yu Chao'en's cue, already brought out a purple robe and put it on Yu Linghui. Yu Linghui bowed to thank Emperor Daizong, who smiled and responded, "This child now has a purple robe. He should be happy." However, he was internally displeased about how the incident went. Yuan saw that Emperor Daizong was becoming displeased with Yu, and therefore suggested to Emperor Daizong to eliminate Yu. They began to plot together. Yuan began to bribe two close associates of Yu's; Zhou Hao (周皓) the commander of the imperial guard archery corps, and Huangfu Wen (皇甫溫) the military governor of Shan Circuit (headquartered in modern Sanmenxia). Zhou and Huangfu became associates of Yuan's, and from this point on, Yuan and Emperor Daizong were able to anticipate Yu's moves.

In spring 770, at Yuan's suggestion, Emperor Daizong carried out several moves that were intending to be preludes to eliminating Yu—moving the general Li Baoyu from being the military governor (jiedushi) of Fengxiang Circuit (鳳翔, headquartered in modern Baoji) to Shannan West Circuit (山南西道, headquartered in modern Xi'an, Shaanxi, to the southwest of Chang'an), while moving Huangfu, then the military governor of Shan Circuit (headquartered in modern Sanmenxia) to Fengxiang—while allaying Yu's suspicions by transferring control of four counties near Chang'an to the imperial guards, under Yu's command. (Yuan's intent was that, as Huangfu arrived in Chang'an, to use his soldiers against Yu.) Soon, when Huangfu arrived in Chang'an, Yuan laid a trap for Yu with Huangfu's and Zhou's soldiers, and at a secret meeting between Emperor Daizong and Yu, Yuan and Emperor Daizong acted and killed Yu. Emperor Daizong then issued a public rebuke of Yu and then claimed that, when Yu received the rebuke, he committed suicide. Emperor Daizong still had him buried with honors, at imperial expense.

== Notes and references ==
- Old Book of Tang, vol. 184.
- New Book of Tang, vol. 207.
- Zizhi Tongjian, vols. 220, 221, 222, 223, 224.
