= Li Nai =

Lǐ Nǎi (李迺) (750? – ?) was a Tang dynasty prince and Tang Daizong's ninth son. His mother's identity remains unknown.

In the year 779 he was enfeoffed as Prince of Yi (益王).
