= Li Yu, Prince of Dan =

Lǐ Yú (李逾) (740? – April 10, 820) was a Tang dynasty prince and Tang Daizong's fifth son. His mother's identity is unknown.

His birth date is between 746 and 750 judging by his brothers' respective birth dates.

In 775 he became Prince of Chen (郴王).

In 783 Li Yu became Prince of Dan (丹王).

He died in the year 820.
