= Li Lian =

Lǐ Lián (李連) (740? - December 20, 817) was a Tang dynasty prince and Tang Daizong's sixth son. His mother's identity is unknown.

It's estimated that he was born sometime around 746–750.

In 775 he became Prince of En (恩王).

In the year 812, one of his daughters was created princess of a county.

He died in 817.
