= Emperor Daizong of Tang =

Emperor of China from 762 to 779

Emperor Daizong of Tang 唐代宗
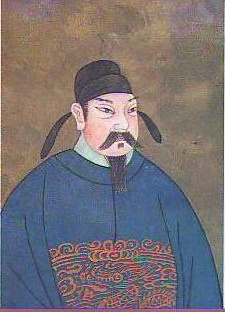

Emperor of the Tang dynasty
- Reign: 18 May 762 – 10 June 779
- Predecessor: Emperor Suzong
- Successor: Emperor Dezong
- Born: 11 November 726; Luoyang, Tang China
- Died: 10 June 779 (aged 52)
- Burial: Yuan Mausoleum (元陵)
- Consorts: Lady Cui of Boling (m. 746; died 757); Empress Zhenyi (died 775); Empress Ruizhen (disappeared 759)
Names
- Family name: Lǐ (李); Given name: Originally Chù (俶), later Yù (豫) (changed in 758)
Era dates
- Guǎngdé (廣德) 763–764; Yǒngtài (永泰) 765–766; Dàlì (大曆) 766–779
Posthumous name
- Emperor Ruiwen Xiaowu (睿文孝武皇帝)
Temple name
- Dàizōng (代宗)
- House: Li
- Dynasty: Tang
- Father: Emperor Suzong
- Mother: Empress Zhangjing

Tang Daizong
- Chinese: 唐代宗
- Literal meaning: "Replacement Ancestor of the Tang"
Transcriptions
Standard Mandarin
- Hanyu Pinyin: Táng Dàizōng

Li Yu
- Chinese: 李豫
- Literal meaning: (personal name)
Transcriptions
Standard Mandarin
- Hanyu Pinyin: Lǐ Yù

Emperor Daizong of Tang (11 November 726 – 10 June 779), personal name Li Yu (name changed in 758 after being created crown prince), né Li Chu (Chinese: 李俶), was the 11th emperor of the Tang dynasty of China.

Emperor Daizong was the eldest son of Emperor Suzong – the first emperor of the Tang dynasty to succeed as the eldest child. During the Anshi Rebellion (which Emperor Suzong's entire reign was dedicated to fighting), he served as a general of Tang and Huige joint operations that recaptured the capital Chang'an and the eastern capital Luoyang from the rebel state of Yan, and the Anshi Rebellion was finally put down early in his own reign, in 763. However, thereafter, the Tang state was plagued by warlords such as Tian Chengsi, Li Baochen, and Liang Chongyi who essentially governed their realms as independent states while only pledging nominal loyalty to the emperor. This would prove disastrous for future generations as subsequent Tang emperors were unable to remove or control these warlords and the central government's power was thus slowly eroded and diminished. The power of the warlords would not prevent the Tang western territories from being overrun by Tibetan invasions and eventually lost to the Tibetan Empire, which even managed to capture Chang'an in 763 for a short period before being expelled.

Emperor Daizong was credited for removing the corrupt eunuch Li Fuguo, who had placed him on the throne using their own power and political influence, later the rest of Emperor Daizong's reign would also see dominance by such individuals as the eunuchs Cheng Yuanzhen and Yu Chao'en, as well as the chancellor Yuan Zai. It is also worth noting that Emperor Daizong became the first Tang emperor to succeed to the throne as a result of maneuvers by eunuchs. Emperor Daizong was himself also said to be overly devout in Buddhism.

== Early life and career ==
Daizong's father, Li Jun, was the Prince of Zhong under his father Emperor Xuanzong when Daizong was born. His mother was Li Jun's concubine Consort Wu. He was the oldest of Emperor Xuanzong's over 100 grandsons. In 740, by which time Li Jun (whose name had been changed to Li Heng by that point) was crown prince, Li Chu was created the Prince of Guangping. That year, his mother Consort Wu died. In his youth, he was said to be kind, meek, and filially pious, and was studious, particularly in the Classic of Rites and the I Ching. He was much favored by his grandfather. Emperor Xuanzong chose for him, as his wife and princess, Lady Cui the daughter of the Lady of Han, a sister of Emperor Xuanzong's favorite concubine Consort Yang Yuhuan; however, his oldest son Li Kuo was born of a concubine, Consort Shen.

In 755, the general An Lushan rebelled at Fanyang (范陽, in modern Beijing), and by summer 756, the forces of his new state of Yan were approaching the Tang capital Chang'an, forcing Emperor Xuanzong to flee to Chengdu. When Emperor Xuanzong's train reached Mawei Station (馬嵬驛, in modern Baoji, Shaanxi), angry soldiers, blaming the rebellion on the chancellor Yang Guozhong (Consort Yang's cousin), killed Yang Guozhong and his family members and forced Emperor Xuanzong to kill Consort Yang. Subsequently, the people in the Mawei region tried to persuade Emperor Xuanzong not to continue on to Chengdu—believing that Chang'an could be recaptured. Emperor Xuanzong asked Li Heng to try to comfort the people. Once Li Heng left Emperor Xuanzong's presence, however, Li Heng's trusted eunuch Li Fuguo, Li Chu's brother Li Tan the Prince of Jianning, and Li Chu, persuaded Li Heng not to follow Emperor Xuanzong to Chengdu—arguing that with the physical barriers between Chang'an and Jiannan Circuit (劍南, headquartered in modern Chengdu), that once they had left the region, Chang'an could no longer be captured. Li Heng agreed and had Li Chu report this to Emperor Xuanzong. Emperor Xuanzong agreed with Li Heng's decision, but he himself continued on to Jiannan. Li Heng, escorted by a small number of guard soldiers commanded by Li Tan, then headed to the border city of Lingwu. With the army at Lingwu pressuring him to take imperial title, Li Heng declared himself emperor (as Emperor Suzong).

== During Emperor Suzong's reign ==
After Emperor Suzong assumed imperial title, he considered making Li Tan the supreme commander of the armed forces, but his advisor Li Mi pointed out that Li Chu was older and that naming Li Tan the supreme commander would cause confusion as to who would be his heir. Emperor Suzong agreed and made Li Chu the supreme commander instead. Subsequently, Li Chu and Li Mi were entrusted with the keys of the makeshift palace, and one would always be on duty to be ready to receive important military reports. In 757, Emperor Suzong considered creating Li Chu crown prince, but Li Mi and Li Chu, pointing out that it would be inappropriate to do so before Chang'an were recaptured, advised him otherwise. Subsequently, Emperor Suzong's court was also itself filled with internal struggles, with Li Fuguo aligned with Emperor Suzong's favorite concubine Consort Zhang, in opposition to Li Chu, Li Tan, and Li Mi. In early 757, after Li Tan repeatedly accused Li Fuguo and Consort Zhang of corruption, Li Fuguo and Empress Zhang in turn falsely accused him of trying to assassinate Li Chu in order to become the heir. Emperor Suzong, in anger, ordered Li Tan to commit suicide, which drew fear from Li Chu and Li Mi. Li Chu considered assassinating Li Fuguo and Consort Zhang, but at Li Mi's urging, stopped his plans to do so.

In fall 757, troops from Huige, whose Bayanchur Khan Yaoluoge Moyanchuo had answered Emperor Suzong's request for help, arrived under the command of Yaoluoge Moyanchuo's son. When Li Chu met the Huige prince, he offered for them to be sworn brothers. The prince was very pleased and honored Li Chu as an older brother. Thereafter, the joint Tang and Huige troops proceeded toward Chang'an and, after defeating Yan forces at Xiangji Temple (香積寺), near Chang'an, recaptured Chang'an. Emperor Suzong had promised that Huige forces would be allowed to pillage Chang'an, but at the earnest pleas of Li Chu, the Huige prince agreed to wait until capturing Luoyang, which had become the Yan capital, to carry out the pillage. The people of Chang'an, believing that Li Chu had saved them from a deadly Huige rampage, welcomed him in a grand procession and proclaimed, "The Prince of Guangping is truly a leader to be loved by both the Han and the barbarians." Meanwhile, when Pugu Huai'en advocated quick advances to try to capture the Yan generals An Shouzhong (安守忠) and Li Guiren (李歸仁), Li Chu, pointing out that his own troops were tired, stopped him. (Upon the recapturing of Chang'an, Li Mi resigned and became a hermit, depriving Li Chu of an ally.)

Subsequently, Li Chu, Guo Ziyi, and Pugu, along with Huige forces, continued to proceed toward Luoyang. They first attacked Shancheng (陝城, in modern Sanmenxia, Henan) and initially could not succeed, but when Huige forces engaged, Yan forces were thrown into a panic and fled. Hearing the news, An Lushan's son and successor An Qingxu, who had become the emperor of Yan, abandoned Luoyang and fled. Once Huige forces entered Luoyang, they went on a rampage. Li Chu had the people gather up a large cache of silk to bribe the Huige prince, and only thereafter did the rampage end.

Upon Li Chu's entry into Luoyang, he initially announced that the Tang officials who had surrendered to Yan would be forgiven. However, soon they were rearrested and delivered to Chang'an. Several were executed, while many others were punished by demotion or exile. In winter 757, Li Chu returned to Chang'an with Guo, and was subsequently created the greater title of Prince of Chu. In spring 758, his title was changed to Prince of Cheng. Emperor Suzong wanted to further create him crown prince, but hesitated because Consort Zhang, who had since been created empress, had a son named Li Shao (李佋), carrying the title of Prince of Zhao, whom she wanted to be crown prince. When he consulted the chancellor Li Kui, Li Kui advocated for Li Chu, and Emperor Suzong agreed, creating Li Chu crown prince on June 29, 758. He also changed Li Chu's name to Li Yu. However, it was said that Empress Zhang did not give up the idea of having Li Shao become crown prince and was looking for ways to undermine Li Yu. Li Yu tried to react with meekness and humility. After Li Shao died in 759, because Empress Zhang's other son, Li Tong (李侗) the Prince of Ding was still young, Li Yu's position was no longer threatened.

In 762, Emperor Suzong had become seriously ill. After Emperor Xuanzong died in summer 762, Emperor Suzong, in mourning, grew worse. He had Li Yu assume regent powers. By this point, Empress Zhang and Li Fuguo were no longer allies, and Empress Zhang summoned Li Yu, wanting an alliance with him to kill Li Fuguo and his subordinate Cheng Yuanzhen. Li Yu refused, pointing out that this would cause alarm to the very-ill Emperor Suzong. Empress Zhang then entered into an alliance with Li Yu's younger brother Li Xi (李係) the Prince of Yue, and they tried to set a trap for Li Fuguo, with 200 strong eunuchs loyal to her and Li Xi ready to act against Li Fuguo. On May 14, 762, she issued an order in Emperor Suzong's name, summoning Li Yu into the palace. However, Cheng received this news and reported this to Li Fuguo and Li Yu, and Cheng then escorted Li Yu to the imperial guard headquarters. Imperial guards commanded by Li Fuguo and Cheng then entered the palace and arrested Empress Zhang, Li Xi, and their associates. It was said that with Emperor Suzong resting at Changsheng Hall (長生殿), the soldiers dragged Empress Zhang and the attending ladies in waiting and eunuchs away from his presence. Emperor Suzong was said to be left alone without attendants. He died on May 16. Li Fuguo executed Empress Zhang, Li Xi, and Li Xian (李僩) the Prince of Yan. On May 18, Li Yu ascended the throne (as Emperor Daizong).

== Reign ==
=== Remainder of Baoying era (762-763), and Guangde, Yongtai eras (763–766) ===
Li Fuguo effectively took over the control of the imperial government, going as far as telling Emperor Daizong:

You, Emperor, just remain in the palace. Let this old servant of yours handle what is outside.

Emperor Daizong was secretly displeased, but in order to placate Li Fuguo, gave him the title of Shangfu (尚父, meaning, "like father") and ordered that he not be referred to by name. He also made Li Fuguo Sikong (司空, one of the Three Excellencies) and Zhongshu Ling (中書令) – the head of the legislative bureau of government (中書省, Zhongshu Sheng) and a post considered one for a chancellor. Li Fuguo gave a major part of the command responsibilities to Cheng Yuanzhen. Carrying out further retaliation against Xiao Hua, Li Fuguo had Xiao further demoted.

Meanwhile, though, Li Fuguo did not expect that both Emperor Daizong and Cheng, who wanted more power, would turn against him. In summer 762, at Cheng's secret suggestion, Emperor Daizong issued an edict that stripped Li Fuguo of the titles of minister of defense and assistant of military affairs to the supreme commander—thus stripping him of military command—giving the latter post to Cheng. He also ordered Li Fuguo to leave the palace and take residence up outside, although he created Li Fuguo the Prince of Bolu. Li Fuguo became apprehensive and offered to retire, and Emperor Daizong declined and sent him away with formal respect. Because Li Fuguo had killed Empress Zhang and had supported him for the throne, Emperor Daizong did not want to kill him openly. Instead, on November 12, 762, an assassin got into Li Fuguo's mansion and killed him, taking his head and an arm away as well. Emperor Daizong formally issued an order seeking the arrest of the assassin, and buried Li Fuguo in a grand ceremony, after having a wooden head and wooden arm carved to be buried with the rest of the body.

At this point, Emperor Daizong still had to face Yan, now ruled by Shi Chaoyi—the son and successor to Shi Siming, who had killed and succeeded An Qingxu and recaptured Luoyang from Tang in 759. Late in 762, he sent the eunuch Liu Qingtan (劉清潭) to Huige to request aid from its Dengli Khan Yaoluoge Yidijian (a younger brother of the Huige prince that he had previously become sworn brother to), who had also received an alliance proposal from Shi Chaoyi. Yaoluoge Yidijian thus initially rejected Emperor Daizong's proposal and advanced south to aid Shi Chaoyi, but after further persuasion by Pugu Huai'en, whose daughter he had married, he agreed with the Tang proposal. In winter 762, the joint Tang and Huige forces recaptured Luoyang, forcing Shi Chaoyi to flee. (Shi Chaoyi would eventually commit suicide in spring 763, ending Yan.)

In the aftermaths of Yan's destruction, Emperor Daizong contemplated what to do with several Yan generals who had surrendered to Tang but who still retained substantial holdings—Xue Song, Li Huaixian, Zhang Zhongzhi (on whom Emperor Daizong soon bestowed the imperial surname of Li and a new personal name, Baochen), and Tian Chengsi. Pugu suggested that he allow them to remain at their posts as military governors (Jiedushi) to avoid further resistance, and Emperor Daizong, fearful of further wars, agreed. This would mark the beginning of warlordism that plagued Tang for the rest of the dynasty.

In fall 763, Emperor Daizong faced two new additional threats. Pugu, whom two other generals Xin Yunjing (辛雲京) and Li Baoyu and the eunuch Luo Fengxian (駱奉仙) had suspected of plotting rebellion, was angry at the suspicion on him and, after submitting a number of accusatory petitions, began to act independently of the imperial government. Meanwhile, though, Tibet, which had begun to seize Tang western prefectures one by one during the Anshi Rebellion, launched a sudden attack on Chang'an. At that time, with Cheng in power and the generals hating him for his previous accusations against the generals Lai Tian (來瑱) and Li Huairang (李懷讓) that led to their deaths, when Emperor Daizong sought emergency aid from the provincial generals, none came to his aid, and on November 16, he was forced to abandon Chang'an and flee to Shan Prefecture (i.e., Shancheng). Tibetan forces declared Emperor Suzong's cousin Li Chenghong the Prince of Guangwu the Emperor of Tang, although they withdrew within the course of a month due to the Tang people's resistance efforts and counterattacks commanded by Guo Ziyi. Emperor Daizong was able to soon return to Chang'an. Still, much territory had fallen into Tibetan hands and Tang forces were not able to counterattack. As the popular sentiment at the time blamed Cheng for the disaster, he stripped Cheng of his posts and sent him back to his home. Soon thereafter, the most powerful figures at court became the chancellor Yuan Zai, who flattered Emperor Daizong, and the eunuch Yu Chao'en, who commanded the imperial guards.

In 764, Emperor Daizong created Li Kuo, whom he had earlier signaled to be the likely heir by designating him the supreme commander of the armed forces, crown prince. Li Kuo's mother Consort Shen had been captured by Yan forces and disappeared during the Anshi Rebellion; Emperor Daizong sent many imperial messengers throughout the realm to search for Consort Shen, but was not able to find her.

Meanwhile, also in 764, Pugu Huai'en, then at Hezong (河中, in modern Yuncheng, Shanxi), formally rose against Tang imperial troops, against his mother's advice. An attack against Yuci (榆次, in modern Jinzhong, Shanxi), commanded by Pugu Huai'en's son Pugu Yang (僕固瑒), however, was repelled by Tang forces, and Pugu Yang's own soldiers killed him. Pugu, believing he was facing defeat, took his troops, largely from Shuofang Circuit (朔方, headquartered in modern Yinchuan, Ningxia), back to its headquarters at Lingwu and dug in there; he thereafter remained a threat to the Tang imperial government, although Emperor Daizong, still hoping that he would resubmit, never formally declared him a renegade, and when Pugu's mother, who did not follow him to Lingwu, died, he buried her with honors.

Around this time, the official Liu Yan headed a project to reopen Bian River (汴河), a canal that connected the Yellow River and the Huai River, which had been crucial for shipping food supplies from the Yangtze River-Huai River region to Chang'an and Luoyang prior to the Anshi Rebellion but which had become silted during the wars. After the project was completed, Chang'an again had adequate food supplies, allowing the region to begin to recover. Pugu, meanwhile, had allied with Huige and Tibet, and in late 764 and then again in 765 allied with them to attack the Chang'an region. After Pugu died in 765, however, the threat subsided, and his army resubmitted to Emperor Daizong. However, by this point, Emperor was facing, in addition to the four major Yan generals, two more military governors who were de facto independent, Li Zhengji and Liang Chongyi.

Also in 765, after Yan Wu (嚴武) the military governor of Jiannan Circuit died, the succeeding military governor Guo Ying'ai (郭英乂), resentful that the officer Cui Ning had not recommended him to succeed Yan, attacked Cui. Cui counterattacked and defeated Guo, who was killed in flight, and the circuit was thrown into a confusion. Eventually, the situation settled down, but the circuit eventually became effectively independently ruled by Cui, although Cui was more obedient and respectful to the central government than the other warlords. Emperor Daizong tried to have the chancellor Du Hongjian rule the circuit, but Du, unwilling to challenge Cui, soon returned to Chang'an and left the circuit in Cui's hands.

=== Early Dali era ===
Meanwhile, by this point, Emperor Daizong, who had previously favored Taoism, had begun to become a devout Buddhist due to the influences of his chancellors Yuan Zai, Wang Jin, and Du Hongjian. Yuan, in particular, advocated the belief that it was by the blessings of the Buddha that Tang was able to survive the Anshi Rebellion and Pugu's rebellion. As a result, Emperor Daizong's policies began to be heavily influenced by Buddhist principles, and he honored the Buddhist monk Bukong with great honors, including creating him a duke. The temples at Chang'an became very wealthy, and Emperor Daizong further ordered that monks and nuns not be subject to physical punishments. With the emperor and the chancellors all devout Buddhists, Buddhism became the leading influence in the empire. (Traditional historians, such as the Song dynasty historian Sima Guang, ascribed the poor governance and justice system during Emperor Daizong's time to this.)

In 768, after Li Huaixian was assassinated by his officers Zhu Xicai, Zhu Ci, and Zhu Ci's brother Zhu Tao, Emperor Daizong made an attempt to take back control of Lulong Circuit (盧龍, headquartered in modern Beijing), which Li Huaixian had governed. He made Wang Jin the military governor and Zhu Xicai the acting military governor. When Wang arrived at the circuit, Zhu Xicai paid him great respect but did not allow him to take actual rein of the circuit, and Wang returned to Chang'an soon thereafter. Emperor Daizong was forced to make Zhu Xicai the military governor later in the year.

In 770, Emperor Daizong, tired of Yu Chao'en's hold on power and arrogance, plotted with Yuan and laid a trap for Yu, killing him. Thereafter, however, Yuan's power became unchallenged at court.

In 772, Zhu Xicai was in turn assassinated by his subordinate Li Huaiyuan (李懷瑗), and Zhu Ci replaced him. Zhu Ci took a more respectful stand toward the imperial government, and thereafter, while the central government did not take back actual control of Lulong, Lulong soldiers often participated in campaigns commissioned by the imperial government. (Eventually, indeed, Zhu Ci himself would arrive at Chang'an and thereafter remain an imperial general near Chang'an and not return to Lulong, leaving Lulong in Zhu Tao's hands.)

=== Late Dali era ===
In 773, Xue Song died, and Emperor Daizong agreed to let his brother Xue E succeed him in ruling Zhaoyi Circuit (昭義, headquartered in modern Anyang, Henan). However, Tian Chengsi, who ruled nearby Weibo Circuit (魏博, headquartered in modern Handan, Hebei), had other designs. In spring 775, under his encouragement, the Zhaoyi officer Pei Zhiqing (裴志清) rose against Xue E, and Tian subsequently captured Zhaoyi's capital Xiang Prefecture (相州). Xue E fled to imperial territory, while Tian continued his campaign to capture the rest of Zhaoyi territory despite Emperor Daizong's orders to stop his campaign. With Xue Song's other relatives Xue Xiong (薛雄) and Xue Jian (薛堅) still holding Wei (衛州, in modern Xinxiang, Henan) and Ming (洺州, in modern Handan) Prefectures, Tian attacked them and captured those prefectures, as well as Ci Prefecture (磁州, in modern Handan as well). (The remaining prefectures of Zhaoyi came under imperial control and were eventually merged with Zelu Circuit (澤潞, headquartered in modern Changzhi, Shanxi), governed by Li Baoyu's cousin Li Baozhen.)

These defiant actions by Tian, who had already angered Li Zhengji, then ruling Pinglu Circuit (平盧, then headquartered in modern Weifang, Shandong), by disrespecting him and Li Baochen, then ruling Chengde Circuit (成德, headquartered in modern Shijiazhuang, Hebei), by killing Li Baochen's brother Li Baozheng (李寶正), brought a serious imperial response, along with the offended warlords. In summer 775, Emperor Daizong announced a campaign against Tian, with Li Zhengji and Li Zhongchen attacking Weibo from the south, and Zhu Tao, Li Baochen, and Xue Jianxun (薛兼訓) attacking Weibo from the north. Initially, the imperial forces were scoring victories over Weibo forces, but after Tian flattered Li Zhengji in a humble letter, Li Zhengji withdrew from the campaign, causing other imperial generals south of the Yellow River to hesitate to advance as well. Meanwhile, Li Baochen was offended when an imperial eunuch, Ma Chengqian (馬承倩), who had visited Li Baochen's army, was so dissatisfied with Li Baochen's gift to him that he threw it on the ground, and Tian was also able to use hoaxes to persuade Li Baochen that if he joined forces with Tian to attack Lulong, he would be successful. Li Baochen thus turned against Zhu, launching a surprise attack on him, but was unable to kill Zhu, effectively ending any hopes of the campaign against Tian. By 776, Emperor Daizong was forced to pardon Tian and abandon the campaign.

Also in 775, Emperor Daizong's favorite concubine Consort Dugu died. He posthumously honored her empress and, saddened greatly by her death, kept her casket in the palace for almost three years, only finally burying her in 778.

In 776, after the death of Biansong Circuit (汴宋, headquartered in modern Kaifeng, Henan)'s acting military governor Tian Shenyu (田神玉), its officer Li Lingyao (李靈曜) seized the circuit. Emperor Daizong commissioned a campaign by the surrounding circuits against Biansong and Li Lingyao, and despite aid from Tian, was quickly defeated, although the imperial government received little benefit as five of Biansong's eight prefectures were taken and merged into Li Zhengji's Pinglu Circuit, and Li Zhengji then moved his headquarters from Qing Prefecture (青州) to one of the Biansong prefectures he took, Yun Prefecture (鄆州, in modern Tai'an, Shandong).

In 777, Emperor Daizong, tired of Yuan Zai's and Wang Jin's corruption and hold on power, had them arrested. Yuan was executed and Wang was exiled, and they were replaced by Yang Wan and Chang Gun. Emperor Daizong hoped that Yang could lead a reform of the government, but Yang died later that year, leaving Chang in control of the government.

By 777, it was considered that these warlords were ruling their realms de facto independently:

- Li Zhengji, with his Pinglu Circuit containing 15 prefectures and having 60,000 soldiers.
- Tian Chengsi, with his Weibo Circuit containing seven prefectures and having 50,000 soldiers.
- Li Baochen, with his Chengde Circuit containing seven prefectures and having 50,000 soldiers.
- Liang Chongyi, with his Shannan East Circuit (山南東道, headquartered in modern Xiangfan, Hubei) containing six prefectures and having 25,000 soldiers.

In 779, Tian died, and Emperor Daizong permitted Tian's nephew Tian Yue to succeed him. Meanwhile, Li Zhongchen was expelled from his Huaixi Circuit (淮西, headquartered in modern Zhumadian, Henan) by his officer Li Xilie. Emperor Daizong, believing Li Zhongchen to have been faithful to him, kept him at Chang'an as a chancellor, while making Li Xilie acting military governor.

In summer 779, Emperor Daizong grew ill and soon died. Li Kuo succeeded him as emperor (as Emperor Dezong).

== Chancellors during reign ==
- Miao Jinqing (762–763)
- Pei Zunqing (762–763)
- Yuan Zai (762–777)
- Li Fuguo (762) (Note: Li Fuguo was not listed in the table of chancellors in the New Book of Tang, but clearly took chancellor title and exercised chancellor (indeed, greater) authorities. Compare New Book of Tang, vol. 62 with Zizhi Tongjian, vol. 222.)
- Liu Yan (763–764)
- Li Kuo (763–764)
- Li Xian (763–764)
- Wang Jin (764–777)
- Du Hongjian (764–769)
- Pei Mian (769)
- Yang Wan (777)
- Chang Gun (777–779)
- Li Zhongchen (779)

== Family ==
- Noble Consort, of the Cui clan of Boling (貴妃 博陵崔氏; d. 757)
  - Li Miao, Crown Prince Zhaojing (昭靖皇太子 李邈; 746–773), second son
  - Li Su, Prince Shu (蜀王 李溯; d. 783), 12th son
  - Princess Qizhaoyi (齊昭懿公主; d. 810), 4th daughter
    - Married Guo Ai of Huayin, Duke Dai (華陰 郭曖; 752–800), the sixth son of Guo Ziyi, in 765, and had issue (three sons, two daughters including Empress Yi'an)
- Empress Zhenyi, of the Dugu clan of Jingzhao (貞懿皇后 京兆獨孤氏; d. 775)
  - Li Jiong, Prince Han (韓王 李迥; 750–796), 7th son
  - Princess Huayang (華陽公主; d. 774), 5th daughter
- Empress Ruizhen, of the Shen clan of Wuxing (睿真皇后 吳興沈氏)
  - Li Kuo, Dezong (德宗 李適; 742–805), first son
- Consort Dowager, of the Unknown clan (太妃)
  - Li Tong, Prince Gong (恭王 李通), 18th son
- Consort Dowager, of the Unknown clan (太妃; d.795)
  - Li Yu, Prince Duan (端王 李遇; d. 791), 16th son
- Consort, of the Yuwen clan (妃宇文氏)
- Consort, of the Yuwen clan (妃宇文氏)
- Imperial Concubine of the First Rank of the Zhang clan (昭儀 张氏), personal name Honghong (红红)
- Unknown
  - Li Xia, Prince Jun (均王 李遐), third son
  - Li Shu, Prince Mu (睦王 李述; d. 791), fourth son
  - Li Yu, Prince Dan (丹王 李逾; d. 820), fifth son
  - Li Lian, Prince En (恩王 李連; d. 817), sixth son
  - Li Gou, Prince Jian (簡王 李遘; d. 809), eighth son
  - Li Nai, Prince Yi (益王 李迺), ninth son
  - Li Xun, Prince Sui (隋王 李迅; d. 784), tenth son
  - Li Xuan, Prince Jing (荊王 李選), 11th son
  - Li Zao, Prince Xin (忻王 李造; d. 811), 13th son
  - Li Xian, Prince Shao (韶王 李暹; d. 796), 14th son
  - Li Yun, Prince Jia (嘉王 李運; d. 838), 15th son
  - Li Yu, Prince Xun (循王 李遹), 17th son
  - Li Kui, Prince Yuan (原王 李逵; d. 832), 19th son
  - Li Yi, Prince Ya (雅王 李逸; d. 790), 20th son
  - Princess Lingxian (靈仙公主), 1st daughter
  - Princess Zhending (真定公主), 2nd daughter
  - Princess Yongqing (永清公主), 3rd daughter
    - Married Pei Fang of Hedong (河東 裴仿)
  - Princess Yuqing (玉清公主), 7th daughter
  - Princess Jiafeng (嘉豐公主), 8th daughter
    - Married Gao Yi (高怡) in 772
  - Princess Changlin (長林公主), 9th daughter
    - Married Shen Ming of Wuxing (吳興 沈明) in 786, and had issue (one daughter)
  - Princess Taihe (太和公主), 10th daughter
  - Princess Zhaozhuangyi (趙莊懿公主), 11th daughter
    - Married Tian Xu, Prince Changshan (田緒; 764–796), the sixth son of Tian Chengsi, in 785
  - Princess Yuxu (玉虛公主), 6th daughter
  - Princess Puning (普寧公主), 12th daughter
    - Married Wu Shiguang (吳士廣) in 772
  - Princess Jinyang (晉陽公主), 13th daughter
    - Married Pei Ye of Hedong (河東 裴液)
  - Princess Yiqing (義清公主), 14th daughter
    - Married Liu Gao of Hedong (河東 柳杲)
  - Princess Shouchang (壽昌公主), 15th daughter
    - Married Dou Keliang of Henan (河南 竇克良)
  - Princess Xindu (新都公主), personal name Chang (暢), 16th daughter
    - Married Tian Hua (田華), the third son of Tian Chengsi, in 796
  - Princess Xiping (西平公主; d. 784), 17th daughter
  - Princess Zhangning (章寧公主), 18th daughter
  - Princess Le'an (樂安公主), 20th daughter
    - Married Zhang Hu (張怙)
  - Princess Yongle (永樂公主), 19th daughter
    - Married Tian Hua (田華), the third son of Tian Chengsi, in 781

== See also ==
- Chinese emperors family tree (middle)
- Yu Daniang: Chinese businesswoman during his reign, influential in the shipbuilding business.

== Notes ==
Regnal titles
Preceded by Emperor Suzong of Tang	Emperor of the Tang dynasty 762–779	Succeeded by Emperor Dezong of Tang
Preceded by Emperor Suzong of Tang	Emperor of China (most regions); 762–779	Succeeded by Emperor Dezong of Tang
Preceded by Shi Chaoyi of Yan	Emperor of China (Northern/Central); 763–779	Succeeded by Emperor Dezong of Tang
