= Pei Zunqing =

Chinese judge, politician and writer

Pei Zunqing (Chinese: 裴遵慶; died 775), courtesy name Shaoliang (少良), was a Chinese judge, politician, and writer during the Tang dynasty, serving as a chancellor during the reigns of Emperor Suzong and Emperor Daizong.

== Background ==
It is not known what year Pei Zunqing was born—but as he was said to be in his 90s at his death in 775, based on Chinese protocol of age-counting, he would have been born between 677 and 686. He was from a prominent clan of Jiang Prefecture (絳州, in modern Yuncheng, Shanxi), which traced its ancestry to officials of Han dynasty, Cao Wei, Jin dynasty (266–420), Western Liang, Northern Wei, and Tang dynasty. Pei Zunqing's grandfather Pei Yihong (裴義弘) served as a mid-level official at the legislative bureau of government (中書省, Zhongshu Sheng) and carried the title of Duke of Xuanwu. Pei Zunqing's father Pei Quan (裴惓) was a prefectural prefect and carried the title of Baron of Hedong. Pei Zunqing had at least two older brothers, Pei Zunyu (裴遵裕) and Pei Zunye (裴遵業).

== During Emperor Xuanzong's reign ==
It was said that Pei Zunqing was ambitious but mild in his disposition, and he was studious and careful in his behavior in his youth. When he had become relatively old for a new official, he, on account of his heritage, was made the legal officer at Lu Prefecture (潞州, in modern Changzhi, Shanxi). Because of his relatively old age, he was not noticed, but was eventually summoned to the Tang capital Chang'an to serve in the ministry of civil service affairs (吏部, Libu), and then to serve as Dali Cheng (大理丞), the secretary general of the supreme court (大理寺, Dali Si). It was said that he was capable in judging cases and decided them logically. On one occasion, because the general Xiao Keji (蕭克濟) was harsh toward his subordinates, his soldiers made comments that suggested they were suggesting rebellion. When they were charged with treason, Pei responded, "They had no money to gather people, and no talent to command people. How could they commit treason?" It was said that because of Pei's judgment, tens of households were saved. Later, late in Emperor Xuanzong's Tianbao era (742–756), Pei served as a junior official at the ministry of civil service affairs and was in charge of selecting the junior officials. It was said that because the realm was peaceful at times, each year there would be tens of thousands of people coming to Chang'an seeking official commissions. Pei was said to be dexterous, knowledgeable, good in memory, detailed, and not harsh, despite the large amount of work he had to carry out, and was said to be the best at the task. During this period, he wrote a work known as the Records of the Kings' Governance (王政記), discussing the rites from ancient days to his own days; it was said that those who read the work saw that he had talent to be a high-level official. Toward the end of the Tianbao era, the chancellor Yang Guozhong was exceedingly powerful, and he sent most officials who were not his followers away from the capital. As Pei did not flatter Yang, he was sent out of the capital to serve as a commandery governor.

== During Emperor Suzong's reign ==
After Emperor Xuanzong was succeeded by his son Emperor Suzong in 756, Emperor Suzong recalled Pei Zunqing to serve as imperial attendant (給事中, Jishizhong), Shangshu You Cheng (尚書右丞, one of the secretaries general at the executive bureau (尚書省, Shangshu Sheng)), and deputy minister of civil service affairs (吏部侍郎, Libu Shilang). Pei was said to be frugal and careful, drawing much praise. While Xiao Hua was chancellor, he knew Pei well and, whenever he met Emperor Suzong, would recommend Pei for promotion. In 761, based on Xiao's recommendation, Pei was made Huangmen Shilang (黃門侍郎) — the deputy head of the examination bureau (門下省, Menxia Sheng) — and given the designation Tong Zhongshu Menxia Pingzhangshi (同中書門下平章事), making him a chancellor de facto.

== During Emperor Daizong's reign ==
Emperor Suzong died in 762 and was succeeded by his son Emperor Daizong. Pei Zunqing continued to serve as chancellor. In 763, when the relationship between the imperial government and the general Pugu Huai'en had become exceedingly tense, because Emperor Daizong knew Pei to be faithful and honest, he sent Pei to Hezhong (河中, in modern Yuncheng) to try to soothe Pugu and persuade him to report to Chang'an. Pei was initially able to persuade Pugu to do so, but after opposition by Pugu's subordinate Fan Zhicheng (范志誠), Pugu changed his mind, and Pei returned to Chang'an empty-handed. (Pugu eventually rebelled, and his rebellion was only ended when he died in 765.) In 763, when a surprise attack on Chang'an by the Tibetan Empire forced Emperor Daizong to flee Chang'an, Pei was able to escape and follow Emperor Daizong to Shan Prefecture (陝州, in modern Sanmenxia, Henan). After Emperor Daizong returned to Chang'an, Pei and a fellow chancellor, Miao Jinqing, were removed from their chancellor posts and given honorary positions—in Pei's case, as an advisor to Emperor Daizong's crown prince Li Kuo. Pei was soon made minister of civil service affairs (吏部尚書) and You Puye (右僕射), one of the heads of the executive bureau. He was again put in charge of selecting officials. As Pei was extremely old at the time, he was allowed to carry out this task at his mansion, which was considered a very high honor. On one occasion, a distant relative of his submitted an accusation that Pei was plotting treason, but Emperor Daizong knew of his carefulness and faithfulness and took no heed of the accusation. In his old age, Pei was said to be even more strict in his own behavior—he would be displeased if someone he recommended came to thank him as he found it to be inappropriate; and while he often conversed with Emperor Daizong to give advice, he would destroy the records of their conversations later. He died in 775, while still serving in these duties. His great-grandson Pei Shu would later serve as chancellor near the end of the Tang dynasty, under Emperor Zhaozong and Emperor Ai.

== Notes and references ==
- Old Book of Tang, vol. 113
- New Book of Tang, vol. 140.
- Zizhi Tongjian, vols. 222, 223.
