= Li Gui (prince) =

Lǐ Guī (李傀) (750 - November 2, 783) was a Tang dynasty prince and the twelfth son of Tang Daizong, born to consort Cui.

He became Prince of Zhào in 757.

In 760, he was given the honorary office of Bīnníng Jiédùshǐ (邠寧節度使) in modern Bin County, Shaanxi Province.

In 781, his name was changed to Lǐ Suì (李遂), and in 782, changed again to Lǐ Sù (李遡).

In 783, Li Su was killed along with uncle Li Jing (李僅) at Chang'an during the Jingyuan Mutiny.
