= Consort Dugu (Tang dynasty) =

Consort Dúgū, imperial consort rank Guìfēi (獨孤貴妃, personal name unknown) (died November 3, 775), formally Empress Zhēnyì (貞懿皇后, literally "the virtuous and kind empress"), was an imperial consort of the Chinese Tang dynasty, during the reign of Emperor Daizong (Li Chu). She was Emperor Daizong's favorite concubine and, while she never became empress in her lifetime, she dominated inside the palace. He posthumously honored her as empress after her death in 775.

== Background ==
It is not known when the future Consort Dugu was born, or where her family was from. Her father Dugu Ying (獨孤穎) was an officer in the imperial guard corps. She became a concubine of Li Chu, then the Prince of Guangping under his father Emperor Suzong, in or shortly after 757, when his then-dominant consort Consort Wei died. It was said that she was exceedingly beautiful and drew his favor to the exclusion of all other consorts, and that after her entry into the palace, the other consorts were rarely able to have sexual relations with him.

== As imperial consort ==
After Li Chu, whose name had been changed to Li Yu by that point, became emperor in 762 (as Emperor Daizong), Consort Dugu was given the imperial consort rank of Guifei (貴妃) in 768—the highest rank among imperial consorts, but not the rank of empress, and it was said that it was for her that Emperor Daizong never made anyone else empress. The modern Chinese historian Bo Yang suggested that the reason was that Emperor Daizong did not want to endanger the position of his oldest son Li Kuo, who was crown prince.)

Consort Dugu bore Emperor Daizong two children—Li Jiong (李迥), who was created the Prince of Han in 762 due to the favor that Consort Dugu was enjoying while most of his other brothers were not created imperial princes until 775, and Princess Huayang, who was herself said to be favored by Emperor Daizong greatly due to her intelligence and her ability to discern his likes and dislikes. When Princess Huayang died in 774, he was so greatly saddened that he did not attend imperial meetings for several days until the chancellors asked the eunuch Wu Chengqian (吳承倩) to persuade him to attend to government matters. It was later rumored that the important minister Liu Yan had tried to persuade Emperor Daizong to make Consort Dugu empress, but failed to convince Emperor Daizong. He honored her family greatly—posthumously honoring her father Dugu Ying, and also granting honorific offices to her uncle Dugu Zhuo (獨孤卓) and her brother Dugu Liangzuo (獨孤良佐).

== Death ==
Consort Dugu died in 775. The day after her death, Emperor Daizong posthumously honored her as empress. Greatly saddened by her death, he placed her casket within the palace for years, until he finally buried her on September 19, 778, at the imperial tomb where he would eventually be buried himself. As Princess Huayang had previously been buried at a site that was considered to be too low-lying and wet, he also had Princess Huayang disinterred and reburied near Consort Dugu. He had the chancellor Chang Gun, known for his literary talent, write a lengthy text mourning her.

== Media ==
- Consort Dugu is portrayed by Wan Qian in the 2017 Chinese television series Glory of Tang Dynasty. Her maiden name in the television series is Jingyao.

== Notes and references ==
- Old Book of Tang, vol. 52.
- New Book of Tang, vol. 77.
- Zizhi Tongjian, vols. 224, 225.
