= Li Jiong =

Tang dynasty prince

Lǐ Jiǒng (李迥) (750 – August 16, 796) was a Tang dynasty prince and Emperor Daizong's seventh son. His mother was consort Dugu.

In 761 he was given the title Prince of Yanqing (延慶郡王) by his grandfather Emperor Suzong.

Due to his mother's position as favorite consort of the emperor, Li Jiong was doted on.

In 762, Li Jiong received another title Prince of Han (韓王) from his father Daizong. In 775, he became a jiedushi inspector.

Li Jiong died in 796 during the reign of Emperor Dezong.

== Family ==
Issue:

- Li Xie, Prince of Ankang Commandery (安康郡王 李諧), first son.
