= Wang Jin (Tang dynasty) =

Wang Jin (Chinese: 王縉; 700 – December 31, 781), courtesy name Xiaqing (夏卿), was an official of the Chinese Tang dynasty. He served as a chancellor during the reign of Emperor Daizong. He was a devout Buddhist who encouraged the emperor to become a devout as well, but eventually, the corruption by him and the even more powerful chancellor Yuan Zai, with whom he had a long association, drew Emperor Daizong's ire. In 777, Yuan was executed, and Wang was demoted, never to return to the capital Chang'an.

== Background ==
Wang Jin was born in 700, during the reign of Wu Zetian. His family was originally from Wang clan of Taiyuan, but by the time of Wang Jin was living at Hezhong (河中, in modern Yuncheng, Shanxi). His great-great-grandfather Wang Ruxian (王儒賢), great-grandfather Wang Zhijie (王知節), and father Wang Chulian (王處廉) all served as military advisors to prefectural prefects, while his grandfather Wang Zhou (王冑) served as a low-level official at the ministry of worship. He had at least five brothers – older brother Wang Wei and younger brothers Wang Chan (王繟), Wang Hong (王紘), and Wang Dan (王紞).

Wang Jin was said to be studious in his youth, and both he and Wang Wei – who would eventually become a well-renowned poet – were both known for their literary talents. Wang Jin passed two special imperial examinations – one for poor provincial scholars, and one for scholars with literary talent.

== Early career as imperial official ==
After passing the imperial examinations, Wang Jin successively served as Shiyushi (侍御史), a low-level imperial censor, and a low-level official at the ministry of defense (武部, Wubu). After the general An Lushan rebelled in 755, Wang was selected to be the deputy mayor of Taiyuan Municipality, assisting the general Li Guangbi in defending Taiyuan. It was said that his strategies greatly helped in the defense. During the rebellion (known as the Anshi Rebellion), Wang Wei was captured by the rebels and forced to assume an official post in the rebel state of Yan. After the Anshi Rebellion was largely quelled, Wang Wei was indicted and set to be punished. Wang Jin offered to resign in exchange for his brother's being spared. Wang Wei was then spared, but Wang Jin was only reduced in rank.

Sometime thereafter, Wang Jin was recalled to the capital Chang'an to serve as the principal of the imperial university (國子祭酒, Guozi Jijiu). He later successively served as the mayor of Fengxiang Municipality (鳳翔, in modern Baoji, Shaanxi), the deputy minister of public works (工部侍郎, Gongbu Shilang), and Zuo Sanqi Changshi (左散騎常侍), a high-level consultant at the legislative bureau of government (中書省, Zhongshu Sheng). When then-reigning Emperor Suzong's father Emperor Xuanzong, then Taishang Huang (retired emperor) died in 762, Wang was put in charge of drafting the official mourning text for Emperor Xuanzong, and the work was considered well written. Thereafter, he was made the deputy minister of defense (兵部侍郎, Bingbu Shilang). After the complete end of the Anshi Rebellion (with the death of Yan's final emperor Shi Chaoyi) in 763, Emperor Suzong's son and successor Emperor Daizong (Emperor Suzong's having died as well in 762) sent Wang to survey the former Yan territory. In 764, when the chancellors Liu Yan and Li Xian were removed, Wang and Du Hongjian replaced them — with Wang given the post of Huangmen Shilang (黃門侍郎), the deputy head of the examination bureau (門下省, Menxia Sheng); director of Taiwei Palace (太微宮); and imperial scholar at Hongwen (弘文館) and Chongxian (崇賢館) Pavilions, in addition to the de facto chancellor designation of Tong Zhongshu Menxia Pingzhangshi (同中書門下平章事).

== As chancellor ==
In 764, when Li Guangbi, who was the deputy supreme commander of Tang forces in the Henan region (i.e., modern Henan, Shandong, and northern Jiangsu and Anhui) died, Emperor Daizong sent Wang Jin to Luoyang to replace him and to defend Luoyang. It appeared that he soon returned to Chang'an, however, as he was in Chang'an in 766 when the powerful eunuch Yu Chao'en, then the principal of the imperial university, tried to provoke Wang and his fellow chancellor Yuan Zai by, during a lecture about the I Ching, talking about how a ding (a large cooking vessel often used to symbolize chancellorship) would overturn if imbalanced. Wang was visibly incensed, but Yuan remained calm and pleasant, leading Yu to comment, "It is common for the target to get angry, but one who remains smiling needs to be paid attention to even more carefully." He was also at Chang'an in 767, when the general Guo Ziyi visited Chang'an to pay homage to the emperor, as Emperor Daizong had him, Yuan, and Yu invite Guo to feasts held in Guo's honor.

In 768, when the military governor (Jiedushi) of Lulong Circuit (盧龍, headquartered in modern Beijing), Li Huaixian, who had been ruling his circuit de facto independently from the imperial government, was assassinated by his subordinates Zhu Xicai, Zhu Ci, and Zhu Tao, Emperor Daizong tried to take back control of the circuit by sending Wang to Lulong to serve as its military governor. When Wang subsequently arrived at Lulong, Zhu Xicai formally showed him the utmost respect, but had the soldiers be on high alert and did not allow Wang to take actual reign of the circuit. Wang, knowing that he would be unable to wrest control of the circuit from Zhu Xicai, stayed in Lulong only a few days before returning to the Tang capital Chang'an. Subsequently, Zhu Xicai was made acting military governor and, at the end of 768, military governor. Later in 768, when Xin Yunjing (辛雲京) the military governor of Hedong Circuit (河東, headquartered in modern Taiyuan) died, Emperor Daizong sent Wang to Taiyuan to replace him but also had Wang retain all of his other titles. In 769, Wang offered to yield his post as deputy supreme commander and associated military titles, and Emperor Daizong agreed. Meanwhile, while he was at Hedong, the officers Wang Wuzong (王無縱) and Zhang Fengzhang (張奉璋) both believed that since he was a civilian, they could disobey him without consequence. In fall 769, when he ordered them to lead soldiers to the western borders with the Tibetan Empire to guard against Tibetan attacks, Zhang stalled, while Wang Wuzong reentered the city of Taiyuan without permission. He executed them both, and thereafter the officers did not dare to disobey him any further. In 770, he returned to Chang'an.

Throughout the years, Yuan became the leading chancellor at court, particularly after he helped Emperor Daizong kill Yu in 770. It was said that Wang was obedient to Yuan and therefore their relationship remained well, although Wang was known for his arrogance – an arrogance that even Yuan was displeased with. At that time, the mayor of Jingzhao Municipality (京兆), which encompassed Chang'an, was Li Gan (黎幹), who was willing to criticize Yuan's governance. On one occasion, when Li was reporting to Wang, Wang insulted Li, who was from Rong Prefecture (戎州, in modern Yibin, Sichuan), by stating, "You are a southern gentleman. What do you know about the protocols at court?"

Wang Jin and his brothers were all devout Buddhists, and Wang himself ate no meat at all. After his wife Lady Li died, he made his mansion into a Buddhist temple known as Baoying Temple (寶應寺), to seek blessings for Lady Li. It was said that whenever regional governors arrived at Chang'an, he would take them on a tour of Baoying Temple in order to pressure them into donating to the temple. Due to the influence of not only Wang, but also Yuan and Du (who died in 769 – after first taking tonsure), who were both Buddhists as well, Emperor Daizong also became a devout Buddhist and came under the deep belief that if he remained devout, whatever disasters the empire suffered would not destroy the empire. He thus ordered that Buddhist monks and nuns not be punished for any reason, and that many temples be built. As a result of the emperor's and the chancellors' devotion to Buddhism, many officials became Buddhists as well, and the Old Book of Tang attributed the lack of accomplishments by the imperial administration during Emperor Daizong's reign to this.

By 777, it was said that both Yuan and Wang were exceedingly corrupt, and while Emperor Daizong tolerated them, he was becoming displeased. In 777, he had his uncle, the general Wu Cou (吳湊), arrest them. They were interrogated by a panel of five officials, including Liu Yan and Li Han (李涵). Yuan was executed. Originally, Wang was to be sentenced to forced suicide, but at Liu's suggestion – pointing out that Wang was less culpable than Yuan – Emperor Daizong spared Wang's life and demoted him to be the prefect of Kuo Prefecture (括州, in modern Lishui, Zhejiang).

== After demotion ==
In 779, Wang Jin was given the honorary position of staff member for Emperor Daizong's crown prince Li Kuo, but was not allowed to return to Chang'an; rather, he was ordered to settle in at Luoyang. He died around new year 782, early in Li Kuo's reign (as Emperor Dezong).

== Notes and references ==
- Old Book of Tang, vol. 118.
- New Book of Tang, vol. 145
- Zizhi Tongjian, vols. 223, 224, 225.
