= Liu Peng =

Liu Peng (Chinese: 劉怦; 727 – November 4, 785), formally Duke Gong of Pengcheng (彭城恭公), was a general of the Chinese Tang dynasty, who served as military governor (Jiedushi) of Lulong Circuit (盧龍, headquartered in modern Beijing) briefly in 785 following the death of his cousin, the warlord Zhu Tao.

== Background ==
Liu Peng was born in 727, during the reign of Emperor Xuanzong. His family was from You Prefecture (幽州, in modern Beijing). According to the Gravestone Epitaph of his son Liu Ji, he was a 20th generation descendant of Liu Bei. His father Liu Gong (劉貢) at one point served as a commander of Dadou Army (大斗軍). In Liu Peng's youth, he served as an officer at Fanyang Circuit (范陽, headquartered in modern Beijing, later renamed Lulong Circuit), but left military service to care for his aging parents. When Li Huaixian served as the military governor of Lulong Circuit, he tried to recall Liu back to military service, but Liu declined.

== Service under Zhu Tao ==
In 772, after Li Huaixian's successor Zhu Xicai was assassinated, Liu Peng's cousin Zhu Ci (a son of Liu's mother's brother) became military governor. Contrary to the prior independent stand that Li and Zhu Xicai took as to the imperial government, Zhu Ci was more reconciliatory and submissive to the imperial government, and in 774, he went to the Tang capital Chang'an and thereafter served as an imperial general around the capital, leaving his brother (also Liu's cousin) Zhu Tao in actual control of the circuit. Liu served under Zhu Tao, and through his accomplishments was made the commander of the Xiongwu Army (雄武軍, based on modern Chengde, Hebei). Later, he was made the prefect of Zhuo Prefecture (涿州, in modern Baoding, Hebei).

In 775, Zhu Tao, per mandate of Emperor Daizong, attacked Tian Chengsi the military governor of Weibo Circuit (魏博, headquartered in modern Handan, Hebei), along with Li Baochen the military governor of Chengde Circuit (成德, headquartered in modern Shijiazhuang, Hebei). Because Liu was loved by the army, Zhu put him in command of headquarters before launching his campaign. Tian, however, persuaded Li Baochen to turn against Zhu, and late in 775, Li Baochen launched a surprise attack on Zhu's army and then attacked north, hoping to capture Lulong's headquarters. However, with Li Baochen realizing that Liu had taken precautions, he stopped his attack.

After Li Baochen died in 781, Li Baochen's son Li Weiyue requested imperial sanction to succeed him, but Emperor Daizong's son and successor Emperor Dezong refused, and subsequently, Li Weiyue, along with his allies Tian Yue (Tian Chengsi's nephew, who had succeeded Tian Chengsi in 779), Li Na, and Liang Chongyi, prepared to wage war against the imperial government, and the imperial government responded in kind. Emperor Dezong commissioned Zhu to attack Li Weiyue from the north, and Zhu did so; his victories eventually caused Li Weiyue's subordinate Wang Wujun to assassinate Li Weiyue and surrender.

After the victory at Chengde, however, Emperor Dezong made a series of moves that simultaneously alienated Zhu and Wang. He refused to give Chengde's Shen Prefecture (深州, in modern Hengshui, Hebei) to Lulong, as Zhu had requested. Rather, he divided the seven prefectures of Chengde into three smaller circuits, making Zhang Xiaozhong, the first major Chengde officer to submit to Zhu and join Zhu's operations against Li Weiyue, the military governor of a newly created Yidingcang Circuit (易定滄, headquartered in modern Baoding, soon renamed to Yiwu (義武)), consisting of three prefectures, while giving two prefectures each to Wang and Kang Rizhi (康日知, another Chengde general who had submitted to imperial authority during the campaign), with the lesser titles of military prefect (團練使, Tuanlianshi). Emperor Dezong, on paper, gave Lulong two additional prefectures — De (德州, in modern Dezhou, Shandong) and Di (棣州, in modern Binzhou, Shandong) — both still then held by Li Na. Zhu was angered by Emperor Dezong's refusal to give him any part of Chengde territory (in particular, Shen Prefecture) and requiring him to capture two additional prefectures on his own, while Wang was angered that contrary to Emperor Dezong's implicit promises to give whoever killed Li Weiyue Li Weiyue's offices, he not only received a lesser title, but was in a position where he could easily be destroyed. Tian, who was then still under imperial attack, thus persuaded Zhu and Wang to join him in an alliance to defend against imperial forces. When Liu heard that Zhu was planning to turn against imperial forces, he wrote an earnest letter to Zhu trying to change his mind:

Our old home village in Changping [(昌平, in modern Beijing)] has been named by the imperial government as the Situ Neighborhood of Taiwei Township. This is an eternal accomplishment for men. If you remain faithful and obedient to the emperor, nothing will go against you. Within our own times, An Lushan and Shi Siming were destroyed and their families slaughtered because they, in arrogance, waged war and not cared about whether they succeeded or not. I am your closest relative, and if I remain silent and do not let you know what I think, I would not be serving you properly. I hope you, Situ, will reconsider, so that you do not regret it in the future.

Zhu did not accept his suggestion, but it was said that because he knew that Liu was faithful to him, he did not fear that Liu would turn against him. Subsequently, as he was turning against the imperial government but Zhang refused to join his alliance with Wang and Tian, he had Liu take up position to defend a potential attack by Zhang.

By 784, Zhu's campaign had ended in utter failure after Wang and Tian Yue's cousin and successor Tian Xu turned against him and defeated him along with the imperial general Li Baozhen. Zhu was forced to withdraw with his remaining troops back to Lulong. As he was arriving back in Lulong, he was filled with shames of defeat and feared that Liu might turn against him in light of his defeat. As he was arriving at the headquarters at You Prefecture, however, Liu mobilized the remaining troops and exited the city to welcome him in grand ceremony. Zhu was touched in both sadness and joy when seeing Liu, and the popular opinion at the time credited Liu for his faithfulness.

Zhu died in summer 785, and the soldiers supported Liu to succeed him. Emperor Dezong made Liu the military governor and also created him the Duke of Pengcheng.

== As Jiedushi ==
Liu Peng himself, however, soon fell ill, and Emperor Dezong had his son Liu Ji serve as acting military governor in Liu Peng's illness. Liu Peng only served for three months before he himself died, in fall 785. He was given posthumous honors, and Emperor Dezong made Liu Ji military governor to succeed him.

== Notes and references ==
- Old Book of Tang, vol. 143.
- New Book of Tang, vol. 212.
- Zizhi Tongjian, vols. 225, 227, 231, 232.
