= Wang Shizhen (Tang dynasty) =

General of the Chinese Tang dynasty

Wang Shizhen (Chinese: 王士真; 759–809), courtesy name Gongyi (公一), posthumous name Prince Jingxiang of Qinghe (清河景襄王), was a general of the Chinese Tang dynasty who served as a military governor (jiedushi) of Chengde Circuit (成德; headquartered in modern-day Shijiazhuang, Hebei) and ruled it as a de facto independent regime from the Tang imperial court.

== Background ==
Wang Shizhen was born in 759. It is known that his father was Wang Wujun, who was, around or sometime after his birth, an officer serving under the general Li Baochen, the military governor (jiedushi) of Chengde Circuit, and that he was Wang Wujun's oldest son. Wang Shizhen had at least three younger brothers, Wang Shiqing (王士清), Wang Shiping (王士平), and Wang Shize (王士則).

== Service under Li Baochen and Li Weiyue ==
It was said that Wang Shizhen became a fierce soldier in his youth and was capable in strategies. He became a guard commander for Li Baochen, and Li Baochen gave him a daughter in marriage. Late in Li Baochen's life, he wanted to pass his position to his son Li Weiyue, but feared that Li Weiyue was weak in personality and could not control the officers, and therefore began killing the more capable officers. However, due to the marriage relationship and Wang Shizhen's carefulness in befriending Li Baochen's close associates, Wang Wujun was able to escape this fate.

Li Baochen died in 781, and Emperor Dezong refused to let Li Weiyue inherit his position. Thereafter, Li Weiyue and the rulers of three other allied circuits—Li Na, whom Emperor Dezong similarly refused to allow to inherit his father Li Zhengji's position as military governor of Pinglu Circuit (平盧, headquartered in modern Tai'an, Shandong) upon the latter's death the same year; Tian Yue, the military governor of Weibo Circuit (魏博, headquartered in modern Handan, Hebei); and Liang Chongyi, the military governor of Shannan East Circuit (山南東道, headquartered in modern Xiangfan, Hubei) prepared for war against the imperial government. Liang was quickly defeated by Li Xilie and committed suicide, while imperial forces inflicted serious damage on Tian's and Li Na's forces. Meanwhile, Zhu Tao, the acting military governor of Lulong Circuit (盧龍, headquartered in modern Beijing) attacked Li Weiyue from the north and was quickly able to persuade two key Chengde officers, Zhang Xiaozhong, the prefect of Yi Prefecture (易州, in modern Shijiazhuang) and Kang Rizhi (康日知) the prefect of Zhao Prefecture (趙州, in modern Shijiazhuang), to turn their respective prefectures against Li Weiyue. When Li Weiyue tried to counterattack in spring 782, Zhu and Zhang's joint forces defeated him at Shulu (束鹿, in modern Shijiazhuang), forcing him to flee back to Chengde's capital, Heng Prefecture. It was said that during the Battle of Shulu, Wang Wujun, serving as Li Weiyue's forward commander and believing that Li Weiyue was already suspicious of him, decided not to fight to the best of his ability, and that this led to the defeat.

After the defeat, Li Weiyue was even more suspicious of Wang, but his advisors pointed out that there was no one other than Wang who was capable of commanding the army. Li Weiyue thus commissioned Wang, assisted by Wei Changning (衛常寧), to attack Zhao Prefecture, and put Wang Shizhen in charge of security at headquarters. Wang Wujun was glad to leave Heng Prefecture, and once he exited the city, initially wanted to flee to Zhang. Wei pointed out that Emperor Dezong had issued an edict promising to give the offices that Li Weiyue wanted to whoever would cut off Li Weiyue's head and advocated for an attack on Li Weiyue. Wang Wujun thus notified Wang Shizhen and involved Li Weiyue's close associate Xie Zun (謝遵) in the plot at well. He made a surprise attack against Heng Prefecture, and Wang Shizhen and Xie opened the city gates to welcome him. Wang Shizhen also captured Li Weiyue and delivered him to Wang Wujun. Wang Wujun killed Li Weiyue and his associates and surrendered to the imperial government.

== Service under Wang Wujun ==
After the insurrection was quelled, Emperor Dezong divided Chengde's seven prefectures into three smaller circuits: Zhang Xiaozhong received three prefectures and the title of military governor of the newly created Yidingcang Circuit (易定滄, headquartered in modern Baoding, Hebei, later renamed Yiwu Circuit (義武)), while Wang Wujun and Kang Rizhi received two prefectures each with the lesser titles of military prefect (團練使, Tuanlianshi), of Hengji (恆冀) and Shenzhao (深趙, both headquartered in modern Shijiazhuang). This displeased both Zhu Tao and Wang—as Zhu had wanted Emperor Dezong to give him Shen Prefecture (深州, in modern Hengshui, Hebei), which went to Kang instead (Emperor Dezong gave Zhu two prefectures on paper, De (德州, in modern Dezhou, Shandong) and Di (棣州, in modern Binzhou, Shandong), both then still held by Li Na), and Wang believed that Emperor Dezong had reneged on the promise to reward him with the positions that Li Weiyue had wanted. He was further fearful when he received orders to provide Zhu's army with food and Ma Sui's army (which was then attacking Tian Yue) with horses, believing that Emperor Dezong might be using those orders to weaken his power and prepare to attack him next. Tian, hearing of Zhu's disaffection, sent emissaries to Zhu to persuade him to turn against the imperial forces and aid him. Zhu agreed, and in turn sent emissaries to Wang, persuading him to join the alliance as well and agreeing to give him Shen Prefecture, which Zhu occupied at the time. Wang was pleased, and agreed to join him and Tian.

Subsequently, with Tian in desperate straits, Zhu and Wang Wujun advanced south and dealt a severe blow to the imperial forces, forcing them to lift the siege on Weibo's capital Wei Prefecture (魏州). Meanwhile, the imperial general Li Sheng took this opportunity to attack north and joined forces with Zhang, forcing Wang Shizhen, who was then besieging Kang at Zhao Prefecture, to lift the siege on Zhao Prefecture and withdraw back to Heng Prefecture. Meanwhile, in the aftermath of the imperial forces' defeat, Tian was grateful to Zhu, and offered to subjugate himself and Wang Wujun to Zhu—in effect, offering the imperial title to Zhu. Zhu declined, crediting Wang rather than himself for the victory. At the suggestion of Zhu's staff member Li Ziqian (李子千) and Wang's staff member Zheng Ru (鄭濡), they decided to each claim a princely title to show independence from imperial authority, but keep Tang's era name in order not to completely break from Tang. On December 9, 782, in an elaborate ceremony, Zhu claimed the title of Prince of Ji; Wang claimed the title of Prince of Zhao; Tian claimed the title of Prince of Wei; and they issued a letter offering Li Na the title of Prince of Qi. They also established administrations with governmental structures paralleling the Tang imperial government to further show independence, although the titles were intentionally different than Tang's to show some subordination. After Wang Wujun claimed royal title, he bestowed the titles of Sikong (司空, one of the Three Excellencies) and supreme commander of the armed forces on Wang Shizhen and left him in charge of the capital Zhending (真定, i.e., Heng Prefecture).

Not much is known about Wang Shizhen's activities during the subsequent years of wars, although it is known that after Wang Wujun, Li Na, and Tian Yue removed their own imperial titles and resubmitted to Emperor Dezong's rule in 784, Wang Wujun made him the deputy military governor, and Emperor Dezong also created Wang Shizhen the Prince of Qinghe. In 790, when Zhao Gao (趙鎬), the prefect of Di Prefecture (棣州, in modern Binzhou, Shandong) rebelled against Wang Wujun and surrendered to Li Na, it was Wang Shizhen that Wang Wujun sent to attack Zhao, but Wang Shizhen was unable to recapture Di Prefecture. Only after Emperor Dezong intervened and ordered the two circuits and Weibo Circuit (which was also involved) to make peace with each other did Li Na return Di Prefecture to Chengde. After Wang Wujun died in 801, Emperor Dezong made Wang Shizhen military governor to succeed his father.

== As military governor ==
It was said that Wang Shizhen, while serving his father in the campaigns, suffered much difficulty, and that after he became military governor, he was interested in being restful and peaceful. Like his father and the other de facto independent military governors, he refused to submit taxes to the imperial government and refused to allow the imperial government to commission Chengde officials, but, in contrast with Weibo and Lulong, he often submitted tributes. In 806, by which time Emperor Dezong's grandson Emperor Xianzong was emperor, Emperor Xianzong bestowed on Wang Shizhen the honorary chancellor designation Tong Zhongshu Menxia Pingzhangshi (同中書門下平章事).

In 807, there was a dispute between Wang, Liu Ji, the military governor of Lulong Circuit, and Zhang Maozhao (張茂昭, Zhang Xiaozhong's son), the military governor of Yiwu Circuit that caused them to submit accusations against each other. Emperor Xianzhong sent the official Fang Shi (房式) to mediate a peace between them. Wang Shizhen died in 809, and was given posthumous honors. Emperor Xianzong initially did not allow his oldest son Wang Chengzong to inherit the position, but eventually did.

== Notes and references ==
- Old Book of Tang, vol. 142.
- New Book of Tang, vol. 211.
- Zizhi Tongjian, vols. 226, 227, 233, 236, 237.
