= Liu Ji (general) =

Chinese general of the Tang dynasty

Liu Ji (Chinese: 劉濟; 757 – August 20, 810), courtesy name Jizhi (濟之), was a general of the Chinese Tang dynasty who served as the military governor (jiedushi) of Lulong Circuit (盧龍, headquartered in modern Beijing) from 787 (succeeding his father Liu Peng) to his death in 810, when he was poisoned by his son Liu Zong during an imperially-sanctioned campaign against neighboring Chengde Circuit (成德, headquartered in modern Shijiazhuang, Hebei).

== Background ==
Liu Ji was born in 757—during the Anshi Rebellion, when Fanyang Circuit (范陽, later known as Lulong), where his father Liu Peng was from, was governed by the rebel state Yan, which rivaled Tang dynasty, then ruled by Emperor Suzong. Liu Ji had at least two younger brothers, Liu Yong (劉澭) and Liu Yuan (劉源). After Yan's destruction in 763, Fanyang, renamed Lulong, was nominally reintegrated into Tang, but was then governed successively by Li Huaixian and Zhu Xicai, both of whom ruled it de facto independently from the Tang imperial government. In 772, Liu Peng's cousin Zhu Ci became military governor after assassinating Zhu Xicai, and Liu Peng thereafter successively served under Zhu Ci and his brother Zhu Tao.

Liu Ji himself visited the capital Chang'an in his youth and passed the imperial examinations. In 785, after Zhu Tao died, Liu Peng succeeded him. Liu Ji served as the prefect of Mo Prefecture (莫州, in modern Cangzhou, Hebei) under his father. Later in 785, when Liu Peng grew ill, Liu Yong was by Liu Peng's side, and he quickly summoned Liu Ji back from Mo Prefecture and supported him to succeed their father. The emperor at that time, Emperor Suzong's grandson Emperor Dezong, thus made Liu Ji acting military governor. Liu Peng died soon thereafter, and Liu Ji succeeded him.

== As military governor ==
While the military governors of the region were generally ruling their circuits de facto independently from the imperial regime at the time, Liu Ji was said to treat Emperor Dezong with respect, often offering tributes, and Emperor Dezong also treated him with respect, making him honorary minister of defense. Soon, however, he was embroiled in a dispute with his brother Liu Yong. When he succeeded Liu Peng with Liu Yong's support, he made Liu Yong the prefect of Ying Prefecture (瀛州, in modern Cangzhou) and promised to let Liu Yong succeed him. However, Liu Ji soon made his oldest son Liu Gun (劉緄) deputy military governor, apparently designating Liu Gun as his successor. By 792, Liu Yong, displeased, directly submitted to Emperor Dezong and contributed soldiers to the winter defense against Tufan to the west of Chang'an. Liu Ji, in anger, attacked Liu Yong. By 794, Liu Yong, unable to stand against Liu Ji, abandoned Ying Prefecture and took his soldiers and people west to the region directly under imperial control. In 796, as part of a large number of honorary titles given to military governors, Liu Ji was made honorary chancellor with the designation Tong Zhongshu Menxia Pingzhangshi (同中書門下平章事). In 800, another brother, Liu Yuan, then the prefect of Zhuo Prefecture (涿州, in modern Baoding, Hebei), was resistant of Liu Ji's orders, and Liu Ji defeated and captured him. Liu Ji then delivered him to Chang'an, where Emperor Dezong gave him a minor office and let him stay in Chang'an.

In 806, by which time Emperor Dezong's grandson Emperor Xianzong was emperor, Liu Ji was given the greater title of Palace Attendant, which automatically conveyed chancellor status. In 807, he had disputes with his neighboring military governors—Wang Shizhen the military governor of Chengde Circuit and Zhang Maozhao (張茂昭) the military governor of Yiwu in modern Baoding, and Emperor Xianzong had to dispatch the imperial attendant Fang Shi (房式) to mediate.

In 809, Wang Shizhen died, and Emperor Xianzhong initially refused to follow Emperor Dezong's precedent and allow Wang Shizhen's son Wang Chengzong to succeed as military governor of Chengde, until he extracted from Wang Chengzong a promise to surrender two of Chengde's prefectures to imperial control. Wang Chengzong soon reneged on the promise, however, and Emperor Xianzong ordered a campaign against Chengde. Liu Ji's emissary to Weibo Circuit (魏博, headquartered in modern Handan, Hebei), Tan Zhong (譚忠), was able to persuade Weibo's military governor Tian Ji'an not to join Chengde's cause, and then persuaded Liu Ji himself to attack Chengde—pointing out that if he did not, Emperor Xianzong would believe that he was complicit in Wang Chengzong's resistance. In spring 810, Liu Ji thus launched his own campaign against Chengde, capturing a number of towns. Emperor Xianzong gave him the position of director of the Legislative Bureau (中書令, Zhongshu ling), which also automatically conveyed chancellor status.

Meanwhile, Liu Ji had his second son Liu Zong accompany him on the campaign, while leaving Liu Gun in charge at headquarters. As Liu Ji was at Raoyang (饒陽, in modern Hengshui, Hebei), he grew ill. In Liu Ji's illness, Liu Zong conspired with the staff members Zhang Qi (張玘) and Cheng Guobao (成國寶), forging orders that indicated that Emperor Xianzong was displeased with Liu Ji's lack of progress and read to replace him with Liu Gun. Liu Ji, in shock and anger, executed tens of officers who were friendly to Liu Gun and issued an order summoning Liu Gun. Liu Zong then poisoned Liu Ji's drink, and Liu Ji died of poisoning. Liu Zong then, in Liu Ji's name, caned Liu Gun to death, and took over control of the circuit and the army. Emperor Xianzong posthumously honored Liu Ji and gave him the posthumous name Zhuangwu (莊武, meaning "combative and martial").
