= Zhang Xiaozhong =

Chinese general and rebel during Tang dynasty

Zhang Xiaozhong (Chinese: 張孝忠) (730 – April 30, 791), né Zhang Alao (張阿勞), posthumous name Prince Zhenwu of Shanggu (上谷貞武王), was a Jiedushi of Yiwu Circuit during the Tang dynasty. He was of Xi ancestry. Initially he served the rebel state Yan, during the An Lushan rebellion, and later served the warlord Li Baochen. After Li Baochen's death he joined the Tang imperial cause, giving the Tang army a foothold north of the Yellow River in spite of being surrounded by semi-independent warlord realms.

== Background ==
Zhang Xiaozhong, initially known as Zhang Alao, was born in 730, during the reign of Emperor Xuanzong. He was of Xi ethnicity. His great-grandfather Zhang Jing (張靖) and grandfather Zhang Xun (張遜) were both chieftains of the Yishihuo (乙失活) tribe. During Emperor Xuanzong's Tianbao era (742–756), Zhang Alao's father Zhang Mi (張謐) led his tribal people in submitting to Tang rule and was given an honorary title as the minister of vassal affairs.

Zhang Alao himself was tall, brave, strong, and filially pious. In the region, he and Wang Monuogan (later known as Wang Wujun) were known as the strongest warriors. Near the end of the Tianbao era, as he was a capable archer, he came to serve under the Tang general An Lushan, and made contributions in defeating Tujue tribes.

== During Anshi Rebellion ==
In 755, An Lushan rebelled at Fanyang (范陽, in modern Beijing), and Zhang Alao served as one of his forward commanders, along with Tian Chengsi and Zhang Zhongzhi. After An declared himself emperor of a new state of Yan, Zhang Alao served as a general of the Yan state, and later served under the later Yan emperor Shi Siming and Shi Siming's son and successor Shi Chaoyi as well in their campaigns against Tang. After Yan ended with Shi Chaoyi's death in 763, Zhang Zhongzhi surrendered to Tang, was bestowed the name Li Baochen, and became a Tang general — the military governor (Jiedushi) of Chengde Circuit (成德, headquartered in modern Shijiazhuang, Hebei), and Zhang Alao served under Li Baochen.

== Service under Li Baochen and Li Weiyue ==
While serving under Li Baochen, Zhang Alao was given a number of honorary positions, and a new name of Xiaozhong (meaning "filially pious and faithful"). Li Baochen, believing Zhang to be faithful and brave, initially trusted him greatly, and married his sister-in-law Lady Meigu to Zhang. He also entrusted Zhang with the troops from Yi Prefecture (易州, in modern Baoding, Hebei). In 775, when Tian Chengsi, then the military governor of Weibo Circuit (魏博, headquartered in modern Handan, Hebei) wore out the patience of not only the imperial government by annexing most of Zhaoyi Circuit (昭義, then headquartered in modern Anyang, Henan), killing Li Baochen's brother Li Baozheng (李寶正), and being disrespectful to Li Zhengji the military governor of Pinglu Circuit (平盧, headquartered in modern Weifang, Shandong), Emperor Xuanzong's grandson Emperor Daizong commissioned a campaign against Tian. Tian preemptively attacked Chengde's Ji Prefecture (冀州, in modern Hengshui, Hebei). Li Baochen sent Zhang to defend against the attack with the Chengde elite troops, and when Tian realized that the campaign was not going well for him, he stated, "With Zhang Alao still present, I cannot take Ji Prefecture," and he withdrew. Subsequently, when Li Baochen was tricked by Tian into attacking another general, Zhu Tao, the acting military governor of Lulong Circuit (盧龍, headquartered in modern Beijing) but was unable to seize Lulong Circuit, Li Baochen made Zhang the prefect of Yi Prefecture as precaution of a Zhu counterattack.

Toward the end of Li Baochen's life, he, who was ruling Chengde Circuit as his own domain semi-independent from the Tang imperial government, wanted to pass his position to his son Li Weiyue, but believing Li Weiyue to be weak in personality and might not be able to stand up to some of the stronger officers, he found excuses to execute many of those officers. At one point, he sent Zhang Xiaozhong's brother Zhang Xiaojie (張孝節) to Yi Prefecture to summon Zhang Xiaozhong back to the circuit capital Heng Prefecture (恆州). Zhang Xiaozhong told Zhang Xiaojie to respond to Li Baochen:

What crimes have those officers committed that they were executed one by one? I, Zhang Xiaozhong, fear death, and therefore will not come, but I will also not rebel. This is just like how you, Lord, do not go to pay homage to the emperor.

Zhang Xiaojie protested that if he returned with this message that Li Baochen would surely kill him, but Zhang Xiaozhong pointed out that if they went back together, they would both die, but if he did not go, Li Baochen would not dare to act against Zhang Xiaojie — prediction that turned out to be correct. It was said that because of this, Zhang Xiaozhong and Wang Wujun, whose son Wang Shizhen was a son-in-law to Li Baochen, were the only two senior Chengde officers who survived Li Baochen's executions.

Li Baochen died in 781, and Li Weiyue requested that Emperor Daizong's son and successor Emperor Dezong allow him to succeed Li Baochen. Emperor Dezong refused. As a result, Li Weiyue and his allies Tian Yue (Tian Chengsi's nephew, who had succeeded Tian Chengsi in 779), Li Na (Li Zhengji's son, who, similarly, was rejected by Emperor Dezong as his father's successor when Li Zhengji also died in 781), and Liang Chongyi, the military governor of Shannan East Circuit (山南東道, headquartered in modern Xiangfan, Hubei), prepared for war against the imperial government. Zhu Tao, who was then submissive to the imperial government, attacked Chengde from the north. When he reached Yi Prefecture, Zhang was defending against his attack, but Zhu sent his subordinate Cai Xiong (蔡雄) to convince Zhang that Li Weiyue's cause was hopeless and unjust. Persuaded by Zhu, Zhang submitted to the imperial government, and Emperor Dezong gave Zhang the title of military governor of Chengde. Grateful to Zhu, Zhang had his son Zhang Maohe (張貿和) marry Zhu's daughter and formed a friendship with Zhu. Hearing that Zhang Xiaozhong had turned against him, Li Weiyue slaughtered Zhang Xiaozhong's younger brother Zhang Xiaoyi (张孝义) and three daughters already married still remaining at Heng Prefecture.

== As Jiedushi ==
In spring 782, Zhu Tao and Zhang Xiaozhong captured Shulu (束鹿, in modern Shijiazhuang). Li Weiyue, in fear, considered submitting to the imperial government and giving up Chengde, but after Tian Yue found out, he angrily demanded the death of Li Weiyue's secretary Shao Zhen (邵真), who had recommended submission; Li Weiyue killed Shao and sent an army, commanded by the Weibo officer Meng You (孟祐) and Wang Wujun, to try to recapture Shulu. The joint Zhu and Zhang forces, however, defeated Li Weiyue's forces — as Wang was apprehensive that if he prevailed, Li Weiyue would be without apprehension and would kill him after his return, as Li Weiyue had also been fearful of him. Zhu wanted to continue on to the capital of Chengde, Heng Prefecture, but stopped his advances when, to his surprise, Zhang backed off and withdrew to Yifeng (義豐, in modern Baoding). When his subordinates questioned this move, Zhang stated his reasons:

There are still many experienced officers at Heng Prefecture, and we should not take them lightly. If we pressure them, they will fight to the death. If we relax our pressure, they will turn against each other. You, gentlemen, should just sit and wait; as we wait here at Yifeng, we can see Li Weiyue's destruction. Further, Situ [(司徒, the honorary office that Zhu carried)] Zhu exaggerates in his words and lacks common sense. It is easy to start an undertaking with him, and difficult to complete it.

As Zhang predicted, Wang, once he returned to Heng Prefecture, started an uprising and killed Li Weiyue and surrendered. In the aftermaths of Li Weiyue's death, Li Weiyue's brother-in-law Yang Rongguo (楊榮國), who had been defending Shen Prefecture (深州, in modern Hengshui, Hebei), surrendered to Zhu. With Li Weiyue and Liang (who had been defeated by Li Xilie and committed suicide) defeated and the forces loyal to the imperial government besieging Tian and Li Na, it was believed that the rebels would soon be destroyed and the empire returned to unity.

After the victory at Chengde, however, Emperor Dezong made a series of moves that simultaneously alienated Zhu and Wang. He refused to give Shen Prefecture to Lulong, as Zhu had requested. Rather, he divided the seven prefectures of Chengde into three smaller circuits, making Zhang the military governor of a newly created Yidingcang Circuit (易定滄, headquartered in modern Baoding, soon renamed to Yiwu (義武)), consisting of three prefectures, with his headquarters at Ding Prefecture (定州), while giving two prefectures each to Wang and Kang Rizhi (康日知, another Chengde general who had submitted to imperial authority during the campaign), with the lesser titles of military prefect (團練使, Tuanlianshi). Emperor Dezong, on paper, gave Lulong two additional prefectures — De (德州, in modern Dezhou, Shandong) and Di (棣州, in modern Binzhou, Shandong) — both still then held by Li Na. Zhu was angered by Emperor Dezong's refusal to give him any part of Chengde territory (in particular, Shen Prefecture) and requiring him to capture two additional prefectures on his own, while Wang was angered that contrary to Emperor Dezong's implicit promises to give whoever killed Li Weiyue Li Weiyue's offices, he not only received a lesser title, but was in a position where he could easily be destroyed. Tian Yue, who was then still under imperial attack, thus persuaded Zhu and Wang to join him in an alliance to defend against imperial forces. Zhu and Wang both agreed, although when Zhu further tried to persuade Zhang to join the alliance as well, Zhang refused. As Zhu advanced south to meet Wang and to aid Tian, then, he left his cousin Liu Peng in charge of Lulong Circuit, to defend against a potential attack by Zhang, while Zhang prepared for defending against attacks from Zhu and Wang. Subsequently, when Wang Wujun sent Wang Shizhen to put Kang under siege at Zhao Prefecture (趙州, in modern Shijiazhuang), the imperial general Li Sheng, whose forces had been part of the forces fighting against Tian in the south, requested leave to advance north to meet Zhang to relieve Zhao Prefecture, and Emperor Dezong agreed. Once Li Sheng arrived at Zhao Prefecture, Wang Shizhen lifted the siege and returned to Heng Prefecture. In spring 783, Li Sheng and Zhang's son Zhang Shengyun (張昇雲) attacked Zhu's officer Zheng Jingji (鄭景濟) at Qingyuan (清苑, in modern Baoding). This, however, drew a response from Zhu, who left Tian's capital Wei Prefecture (魏州) and arrived at Qingyuan to battle Li Sheng. He defeated Li Sheng, forcing Zhang Shengyun and Li Sheng, who grew ill after the defeat, back to Yiwu's capital Ding Prefecture (定州).

In fall 783, troops from Jingyuan Circuit (涇原, headquartered in modern Pingliang, Gansu), then at Chang'an to wait for deployment to the eastern battlefield, mutinied when Emperor Dezong did not give them sufficient rewards, forcing Emperor Dezong to flee to Fengtian (奉天, in modern Xianyang, Shaanxi). They supported Zhu Tao's brother Zhu Ci as their leader, and Zhu Ci soon declared himself the emperor of a new state of Qin and put Fengtian under siege. Li Sheng, upon his recovery later in the year, wanted to head immediately toward Fengtian to aid Emperor Dezong, but as Yiwu Circuit was wedged between Zhu Tao's and Wang's territory, Zhang Xiaozhong feared that he would be attacked and so tried to keep Li Sheng at Yiwu. Only after Li Sheng bribed Zhang's subordinates with jade and also kept his son Li Ping (李憑) at Yiwu (to be married to Zhang's daughter) did Zhang agree to let Li Sheng depart, and he further had Yang Rongguo, who had become his subordinate, accompany Li Sheng to aid Emperor Dezong. In spring 784, after Emperor Dezong tried to quell various rebellions by issuing a general pardon, he gave Zhang the honorary chancellor designation of Tong Zhongshu Menxia Pingzhangshi (同中書門下平章事).

In 786, after the realm had become relatively peaceful and submissive to Emperor Dezong's authority again, there was a famine for the region north of the Yellow River. In the aftermaths of the war, there was little food storage, and many people starved to death. During this time, Zhang reduced his own diet and ate just dried beans. It was said that the people appreciated his frugality and considered him a model of goodness. In 787, Emperor Dezong gave him the honorary title of acting Sikong (司空, one of the Three Excellencies), and offered to let his son Zhang Maozong (張茂宗) marry Emperor Dezong's daughter Princess Yizhang. Zhang sent his wife Lady Meigu, who was by this time carrying the title of Lady of Deng, to Chang'an to personally receive Princess Yizhang into the household, and Emperor Dezong welcomed Lady Meigu in a grand ceremony. In 789, for reasons unclear in history, Zhang attacked Wei Prefecture (蔚州, in modern Datong, Shanxi, not the same Wei Prefecture as Weibo's capital) and seized both people and livestock. Emperor Dezong issued an edict condemning the attack, and Zhang withdrew after some 10 days. As a result, Zhang was stripped of his honorary acting Sikong title. He died in 791. He was posthumously created the Prince of Shanggu and given a number of other posthumous honors.

== Sons ==
- Zhang Maozhao (张茂昭), né Zhang Shengyun
- Zhang Maozong
- Zhang Maohe

== Notes and references ==
- Old Book of Tang, vol. 141.
- New Book of Tang, vol. 148.
- Zizhi Tongjian, vols. 217, 225, 226, 227, 228, 229, 231, 233.
