= Li Zhongchen =

Chinese military governor during Tang Dynasty (716-784)

Li Zhongchen (Chinese: 李忠臣) (716 – July 8, 784), né Dong Qin (董秦), was a general of the Chinese Tang dynasty. He was known as both a supporter of the imperial cause but also a corrupt and violent military governor (Jiedushi). He was later expelled by his own army and, because of his service to imperial causes, kept by Emperor Daizong and Emperor Dezong as an official at the Tang capital Chang'an. In 783, he joined Zhu Ci's rebel Qin state, and after Zhu's defeat in 784 was captured and executed.

== Background ==
Dong Qin was born in 716, during the reign of Emperor Xuanzong. His family was from You Prefecture (幽州, roughly modern Beijing). He claimed that his great-grandfather Dong Wenyu (董文昱) was a prefectural prefect; his grandfather Dong Xuanjiang (董玄獎) was an officer under the Protectorate General to Pacify the East; and his father Dong Shenjiao (董神嶠) served as a military recruiting officer. Dong Qin became a soldier when he was young and was said to be unusually capable and strong. He successively served three military governors (Jiedushi) stationed at You Prefecture — Xue Chuyu (薛楚玉), Zhang Shougui (張守珪), and An Lushan, and because of his accomplishments received repeated promotions, eventually receiving a title as general and forward commander at one of the circuits that An governed, Pinglu Circuit (平盧, headquartered in modern Chaoyang, Liaoning).

== Service at Pinglu Circuit ==
In 755, An Lushan rebelled against Emperor Xuanzong's rule, and soon captured the Tang eastern capital Luoyang and declared himself emperor of a new state of Yan. The military governor of Pinglu, Lü Zhihui (呂知誨), was a follower of An's, and he trapped and killed the deputy Protectorate General to Pacify the East, Fumeng Lincha (夫蒙靈詧). In response, Dong Qin and his colleagues Liu Kenu (劉客奴) and Wang Xuanzhi (王玄志) killed Lü and took over the circuit, remaining in remote contact with Yan Zhenqing, one of the few Tang generals resisting Yan forces north of the Yellow River. When Yan informed the Tang imperial government of the situation, Liu was made the military governor to replace Lü, Wang made the deputy protectorate general to replace Fumeng, and Dong was made the military commander of the circuit (兵馬使, Bingmashi). The Pinglu army subsequently made a number of harassing attacks against An's original base at Fanyang (范陽, i.e., modern Beijing), and Dong distinguished himself in these battles, including a victory over the Xi general Abuli (阿布離) when the Xi allied with Yan. Subsequently, after Liu suffered a defeat and returned to Pinglu, Wang, for reasons lost to history, poisoned Liu to death. In spring 757, Wang sent Dong with an army over the Bohai Sea, on simple rafts, to join the general Tian Shen'gong (田神功) to attack Pingyuan (平原, roughly modern Dezhou, Shandong) and Le'an (樂安, roughly modern Binzhou, Shandong) Commanderies, recapturing them from Yan forces. The Tang general in overall command in the area, Li Xian (李銑), exercising imperial authority, made Dong the governor of Pingyuan Commandery. (Dong would not again return to Pinglu from this point on.)

== As roving general during the Anshi Rebellion ==
Later in 757, when Emperor Xuanzong's son Emperor Suzong had taken over as emperor, a joint Tang and Huige army recaptured Chang'an and Luoyang from Yan, then under the rule of An Lushan's son An Qingxu (An Lushan having been assassinated by An Qingxu earlier in the year). An Qingxu fled to Yecheng and put up his defense there. A number of Tang generals, including, in addition to Dong Qin, Guo Ziyi, Lu Jiong (魯炅), Li Huan (李奐), Xu Shuji (許叔冀), Li Siye, Ji Guangchen (季廣琛), Cui Guangyuan (崔光遠), Li Guangbi, and Wang Sili (王思禮), converged on Yecheng and put it under siege, although Tang forces were unable to capture Yecheng quickly. In spring 759, the Yan general Shi Siming, who had briefly submitted to Emperor Suzong but then turned against Tang again, attacked Tang forces at Yecheng and caused them to collapse and scatter, and then killed An Qingxu, taking over as Yan's emperor. He then attacked south. With Guo blamed for the collapse at Yecheng, Li Guangbi was put in overall command of Tang forces in the region, and he put Xu in charge of defending Bian Prefecture (汴州, in modern Kaifeng, Henan). Dong, along with Tian, Liang Pu (梁浦) and Liu Congjian (劉從諫), served under Xu. When Shi arrived at Bian Prefecture and initially defeated Xu, however, Xu surrendered, along with Dong, Tian, Liang, and Liu. Shi had long been impressed by Dong, and he patted Dong's back and stated, "Before, I had only a left hand. Now that I have you, lord, I also have a right hand." When Dong subsequently accompanied Shi in capturing Luoyang and then attacking the key outpost Heyang (河陽, near Luoyang), however, he took the opportunity to flee from Shi's camp and rejoin Li Guangbi, then defending Heyang. Emperor Suzong made Dong the military commander of the Shanxi (陝西) and Shence (神策) Armies, and bestowed on him not only the imperial surname of Li, but also a new personal name, Zhongchen ("faithful subject"). He also created Li Zhongchen the Duke of Longxi and awarded him with much treasure. Li Zhongchen and another military commander of Shence Army, Wei Boyu (衛伯玉), subsequently defended Shan Prefecture (陝州, in modern Sanmenxia, Henan) against the attacks by Shi's general Li Guiren (李歸仁) and were able to repel Li Guiren.

Emperor Suzong died in 762 and was succeeded by his son Emperor Daizong. Soon thereafter, Li Zhongchen was made the military governor of Huaixi Circuit (淮西, headquartered in modern Zhumadian, Henan), governing over 12 prefectures. He subsequently joined other Tang and Huige generals in recapturing Luoyang from Shi Siming's son and successor Shi Chaoyi, forcing Shi Chaoyi to flee. (Shi Chaoyi would subsequently commit suicide, ending the Anshi Rebellion.) After Huige's Bögü Qaghan Yaoluoge Yidijian returned to his own realm, the remaining Huige generals An Ke (安恪) and Shi Diting (石帝庭) gathered groups of bandits and pillaged the region. Emperor Daizong commissioned Dong to destroy them, and he did, before returning to Huaixi.

== As Jiedushi of Huaixi Circuit ==
In 765, when the general Pugu Huai'en, who had rebelled earlier, persuaded Huige and Tufan troops to join him to attack Chang'an, Emperor Daizong, at Guo Ziyi's suggestion, issued orders summoning the generals Li Baoyu, Li Guangjin (李光進, Li Guangbi's brother), Bai Xiaode (白孝德), Ma Lin (馬璘), Hao Tingyu (郝庭玉), and Li Zhongchen. It was said that, though, when most of these generals received the orders, they did not launch their forces immediately. As to Li Zhongchen, though, after he received the orders while playing a ball game with the officers, he immediately ordered that the army be launched. When his subordinates and the eunuch monitoring his army suggested that the army should be launched on a day considered to be lucky, Li Zhongchen became angry and responded, "If parents have a sudden disaster, children cannot wait until a good day to save them." Subsequently, before he and the other generals could reach Chang'an, Pugu died, and the Huige and Tufan army, while initially still advancing toward Chang'an, slowed down. He participated in the subsequent defense of Chang'an, although Huige forces withdrew after Guo persuaded them to do so, and Tufan forces withdrew thereafter as well.

In 767, as the military governor of Tonghua Circuit (同華, in modern Weinan, Shaanxi), Zhou Zhiguang (周智光), became increasingly violent (including, among other things, slaughtering the entire household of fellow military governor Du Mian (杜冕)) and threatening to the emperor, Emperor Daizong sent Guo to attack Zhou, whose subordinates subsequently killed him and surrendered. At that time, Li Zhongchen happened to be heading toward Chang'an from Huaixi to pay homage to the emperor, and he used the excuse of attacking Zhou to enter Hua Prefecture (華州, also in modern Weinan), one of the prefectures under Zhou's command, and pillaged it heavily. It was said that the entire region between the Tong Pass and Chi River (赤水, flowing through Hua Prefecture), all of the people's wealth was stripped, and even the officials' clothes were stripped such that they had to wear clothes made of paper.

In 771, Li Zhongchen personally participated in the yearly defense rotation on the western border against possible Tufan attacks.

In 775, there was a disturbance at Shan Prefecture in which the soldiers mutinied and forcibly expelled their military commander, Zhao Lingzhen (趙令珍). They also pillaged the prefectural treasury. The circuit governor (觀察使, Guanchashi) Li Guoqing (李國清) could not suppress them and only was spared by humiliating himself before them. Emperor Daizong ordered Li Zhongchen, then on another trip to Chang'an to pay homage to him, to suppress the mutiny. When Li Zhongchen arrived at Shan Prefecture, the soldiers knew his reputation and submitted to him, not daring to do anything else. He ordered that they surrender the pillaged items and promised that those who did would not be further prosecuted. They did so, and after he collected the plunders, he did not return them to Shan Prefecture's treasury, but distributed them to his own soldiers.

Later in 775, when Tian Chengsi, the military governor of Weibo Circuit (魏博, headquartered in modern Handan, Hebei), had offended both the emperor and the military governors nearby, Emperor Daizong ordered a campaign be waged against him. Li Zhongchen and Li Zhengji were to attack Weibo from the south, and Zhu Tao, Li Baochen, and Xue Jianxun (薛兼訓) were to attack from the north. Li Zhongchen initially put Weibo's Wei Prefecture (衛州, in modern Xinxiang, Henan) under siege, but after Li Zhengji withdrew from the campaign due to fears that his own soldiers would mutiny and a humble letter Tian sent him, Li Zhongchen withdrew as well. Emperor Daizong was subsequently forced to abandon the campaign against Tian.

In 776, after the death of Tian Shen'gong's brother Tian Shenyu (田神玉), the circuit he then governed, Biansong Circuit (汴宋, headquartered in modern Kaifeng), fell into the hands of his officer Li Lingyao (李靈曜). Emperor Daizong ordered the military governors around Biansong to attack it. Li Zhongchen joined forces with Ma Sui, and their armies constituted the main assault force against Biansong's capital Bian Prefecture. After an initial defeat at Li Lingyao's hands, Li Zhongchen considered withdrawing, but when Ma stood his ground, Li Zhongchen stayed as well and continued the campaign. After several victories, in winter 776, they put Bian Prefecture under siege. When Tian Chengsi dispatched an army commanded by his nephew Tian Yue to aid Li Lingyao, Li Zhongchen sent his subordinate Li Chongqian (李重倩) to launch a surprise attack on Tian Yue's army, causing it to collapse. Without aid, Li Lingyao fled, but was captured by Li Mian the military governor of Yongping Circuit (永平, headquartered in modern Anyang, Henan) and delivered to Chang'an to be executed. It was said that Ma knew that Li Zhongchen would credit only himself with the victory, and so did not enter Bian Prefecture in order to avoid a conflict. When Li Senghui (李僧惠), a Biansong general who had submitted to imperial authority early in the campaign and who had participated in Li Lingyao's defeat, disputed with Li Zhongchen, Li Zhongchen surprised him and killed him at a meeting. Emperor Daizong subsequently gave Li Zhongchen the honorary chancellor designation of Tong Zhongshu Menxia Pingzhangshi (同中書門下平章事) and issued orders adding Bian Prefecture to his circuit and moving Huaixi's headquarters to Bian Prefecture. (However, Li Zhongchen appeared to not have actually moved headquarters to Bian Prefecture from his then-headquarters at Cai Prefecture (蔡州), based on subsequent events.)

It was said that by this point, Li Zhongchen was greedy, violent, and sexually immoral. If his officers' and soldiers' had beautiful wives or daughters, he would often force the women to have sexual relations with him. He entrusted the important matters of the circuit to his brother-in-law Zhang Huiguang (張惠光), whom he made his deputy. Zhang was said to be corrupt and causing much grief to the soldiers. Zhang's son, an officer, was even more corrupt than his father. The officer Li Xilie, a son of a cousin of Li Zhongchen's, was supported by the soldiers, and he took this opportunity to plot a mutiny with his colleague Ding Gao (丁暠). On March 28, 779, Li Xilie and Ding killed Zhang and his son and expelled Li Zhongchen. Li Zhongchen fled to Chang'an. Emperor Daizong, crediting him for his past achievements, kept him at Chang'an and gave him the honorary title of acting Sikong (司空, one of the Three Excellencies) and allowed him to exercise his previously honorary authorities as a chancellor. He made Li Xilie acting military governor, but stripped the circuit of Bian and Ying (潁州, in modern Fuyang, Anhui) Prefectures, transferring them to Yongping Circuit under Li Mian's command.

== As official at Chang'an ==
After Emperor Daizong died later in 779, Li Zhongchen remained as chancellor under Emperor Daizong's son and successor Emperor Dezong. On an occasion, when he met Emperor Dezong to discuss official business, Emperor Dezong commented, "You, lord, have large ears. That is the sign that you are a truly honored person." Li Zhongchen responded, "Your subject has heard that donkeys have large ears and dragons have small ears. My ears are large, but they are donkey ears." Emperor Dezong was happy about the flattery. In 780, when the official Zhang She (張涉), who had previously been Emperor Dezong's teacher, was accused of receiving a bribe from another official, Xin Jinggao (辛京杲), Emperor Dezong was initially set to punish Zhang harshly. Li Zhongchen interceded and stated, "Your Imperial Majesty is the Son of Heaven, but you allowed your teacher to commit crimes out of poverty. Based on the foolish view of your subject, it is not your teacher's fault." Emperor Dezong's anger subsided, and he merely relieved Zhang of his posts and sent him home. Meanwhile, Xin, who, in addition to this, was also accused of killing one of his soldiers due to a private dispute, was set to be executed. Emperor Dezong was about to approve the execution, when Li Zhongchen stated, "Xin Jinggao should have died long ago." When Emperor Dezong asked him why, he responded, "Xin's uncles and brothers all died in service to the empire. Only he remains. That is why I say that he should have died long ago." Emperor Dezong took pity and spared Xin's life, merely demoting him to be a teacher to one of the imperial princes. For these actions of saving colleagues, Li Zhongchen was praised. However, it is said that Li Zhongchen was a straight thinker, and that he did not read or favor scholars. Despite the fact that he had high positions, he was not happy about having lost his military command.

== As official of Zhu Ci's state of Qin/Han ==
In fall 783, soldiers from Jingyuan Circuit (涇原, headquartered in modern Pingliang, Gansu), were at Chang'an, ready to be deployed to the east to battle four rebellious military governors — Zhu Tao, Wang Wujun, Tian Yue (who had inherited his post from Tian Chengsi), and Li Na. Angry that they were not given rewards while at Chang'an, they mutinied, forcing Emperor Dezong to flee to Fengtian (奉天, in modern Xianyang, Shaanxi). They supported Zhu Tao's brother Zhu Ci, who had been relieved of his command after Zhu Tao's rebellion, as their leader. Zhu Ci initially acted as if he was going to calm the situation and then welcome Emperor Dezong back to Chang'an, but was secretly considering taking over as emperor himself. He gathered a group of officials whom he believed to be disaffected from Emperor Dezong — Li Zhongchen, Yuan Xiu (源休), Zhang Guangsheng (張光晟), and Duan Xiushi — and began planning for declaring himself emperor of a new state of Qin. At a meeting of this close circle, however, Duan, who had not been willing to submit to him, tried to assassinate him. Zhu escaped death only with help from Li Zhongchen, and Duan was killed. When Zhu then declared himself the emperor of Qin, he made Li Zhongchen one of his chancellors, and he kept Li Zhongchen in charge of Chang'an when he subsequently personally led troops to siege Fengtian. Li Zhongchen, however, was not able to deal with Tang resistance fighters near Chang'an, forcing Zhu to repeatedly send aid from Fengtian, hindering Zhu's efforts in sieging Fengtian. When the Tang general Li Huaiguang subsequently arrived from the eastern regions and had successes against Qin forces, Zhu was forced to lift the siege on Fengtian and return to Chang'an, allowing Emperor Dezong to survive. After Zhu (who changed his state's name to Han in 784) was further defeated in 784 and fled Chang'an, Li Zhongchen fled Chang'an as well, but was captured by soldiers under the Tang general Li Sheng at Fanchuan (樊川, near Chang'an). He was executed on July 8, along with his son. His possessions were confiscated.

== Notes and references ==
- Old Book of Tang, vol. 145.
- New Book of Tang, vol. 224.2.
- Zizhi Tongjian, vols. 217, 219, 220, 221, 223, 224, 225, 226, 228, 229, 231.
