= Wang Wujun =

Wang Wujun (Chinese: 王武俊; 735 – August 9, 801), courtesy name Yuanying (元英), né Monuogan (沒諾干), posthumous name Prince Zhonglie of Langye (琅邪忠烈王), was an ethnic Khitan military general and politician of China's Tang dynasty. He served as a long-time jiedushi of Chengde Circuit (成德; headquartered in modern-day Shijiazhuang, Hebei) during the reign of Emperor Dezong and ruling Chengde in a de facto independent manner from the Tang imperial court.

== Background ==
Wang Wujun was born in 735 and originally known as Muonuogan. He was from Nujie (怒皆) tribe, of Khitan stock. His grandfather was named Kenagan (可訥干), and his father was named Luju (路俱). During Emperor Xuanzong of Tang's Kaiyuan era (713-741), Luju followed his leader Li Shi (李詩), who took 5,000 households in crossing into Tang borders to submit to Tang. Emperor Xuanzong praised them and allowed them to live in Ji Prefecture (薊州, in modern Tianjin).

It is not known when Wang Wujun acquired the name of Wujun, but it is known that by age 14, he was known for his horsemanship and archery, and he became as famous as Zhang Alao (later known as Zhang Xiaozhong) in the region. Both of them later served the army officer Zhang Zhongzhi, who in turn served under the general An Lushan, who then controlled the region.

== Service under Li Baochen (Zhang Zhongzhi) ==
In 755, An Lushan rebelled against Emperor Xuanzong, and soon declared himself the emperor of a new state of Yan. Zhang Zhongzhi served as a major general of the Yan state, but by 762, Yan, then with Shi Chaoyi as its emperor, was nearing final defeat, and Tang forces were entering the heart of its territory north of the Yellow River. Zhang was then defending Heng Prefecture (恆州, in modern Shijiazhuang, Hebei), and Wang Wujun persuaded him to submit to Tang. Zhang agreed and submitted to Tang with the five prefectures that he controlled, and turned against remaining Yan forces. Emperor Xuanzong's grandson Emperor Daizong, then emperor of Tang, bestowed the imperial surname of Li on Zhang, and Zhang thereafter became known as Li Baochen. Li Baochen was allowed to retain control over the territory he had, which was organized into Chengde Circuit, with Li Baochen as its military governor (Jiedushi). As Wang contributed in the subsequent campaign that cleared the territory, he was created the Prince of Weichuan.

As Li Baochen grew old and intended to pass the territory to his son Li Weiyue, he began killing a number of officers that he feared Li Weiyue could not control. However, as he took a great liking to Wang's son Wang Shizhen and gave Wang Shizhen his daughter in marriage, and Wang Shizhen subsequently gained Li Baochen's trust as well as insider information at LI Baochen's headquarters, Wang Wujun escaped the fate of many of his colleagues.

== Service under Li Weiyue ==
Meanwhile, Li Baochen had also been in alliance with several other military governors who were also ruling their circuits independently from the imperial regime and intending to pass their realms to their descendants — Li Zhengji the military governor of Pinglu Circuit (平盧, headquartered in modern Tai'an, Shandong), Tian Chengsi the military governor of Weibo Circuit (魏博, headquartered in modern Handan, Hebei), and Liang Chongyi the military governor of Shannan East Circuit (山南東道, headquartered in modern Xiangfan, Hubei). When Li Baochen and Li Zhengji, in succession, died in 781, then-emperor Emperor Dezong (Emperor Daizong's son), wanting to break up the warlords' power, refused to let Li Weiyue and Li Zhengji's son Li Na inherit their fathers' positions. Li Weiyue, Li Na, Tian Chengsi's nephew and successor Tian Yue, and Liang thus prepared for war against the imperial regime. Liang was quickly defeated by Li Xilie and committed suicide, while imperial forces inflicted serious damage on Tian's and Li Na's forces. Meanwhile, Zhu Tao the acting military governor of Lulong Circuit (盧龍, headquartered in modern Beijing) attacked Li Weiyue from the north and was quickly able to persuade two key Chengde officers, Zhang Xiaozhong the prefect of Yi Prefecture (易州, in modern Shijiazhuang) and Kang Rizhi (康日知) the prefect of Zhao Prefecture (趙州, in modern Shijiazhuang), to submit their respective prefectures turn against Li Weiyue. When Li Weiyue tried to counterattack in spring 782, Zhu and Zhang's joint forces defeated him at Shulu (束鹿, in modern Shijiazhuang), forcing him to flee back to Chengde's capital Heng Prefecture. It was said that during the Battle of Shulu, Wang Wujun, serving as Li Weiyue's forward commander and believing that Li Weiyue was already suspicious of him, decided not to fight to the best of his ability, and that this led to the defeat.

After the defeat, Li Weiyue was even more suspicious of Wang, but his advisors pointed out that there was no one other than Wang who would be capable to command the army. Li Weiyue thus commissioned Wang, assisted by Wei Changning (衛常寧), to attack Zhao Prefecture, and put Wang Shizhen in charge of security at headquarters. Wang Wujun was relieved to get to leave Heng Prefecture, and once he exited the city, initially wanted to flee to Zhang. Wei pointed out that Emperor Dezong had issued an edict promising to give the offices that Li Weiyue wanted to whoever would cut off Li Weiyue's head and advocated for an attack on Li Weiyue. Wang Wujun thus notified Wang Shizhen and involved Li Weiyue's close associate Xie Zun (謝遵) in the plot at well. He made a surprise attack against Heng Prefecture, and Wang Shizhen and Xie opened the city gates to welcome him. Wang Wujun killed Li Weiyue and his associates and surrendered to the imperial government.

== Rebellion against Emperor Dezong ==
Emperor Dezong, in the aftermaths, divided Chengde's seven prefectures into three smaller circuits — with Zhang Xiaozhong receiving three prefectures and the title of military governor of the newly created Yidingcang Circuit (易定滄, headquartered in modern Baoding, Hebei, later renamed Yiwu Circuit (義武)), while Wang Wujun and Kang Rizhi received two prefectures each with lesser titles of military prefect (團練使, Tuanlianshi), of Hengji (恆冀) and Shenzhao (深趙, both headquartered in modern Shijiazhuang). This displeased both Zhu Tao and Wang — as Zhu had wanted Emperor Dezong to give him Shen Prefecture (深州, in modern Hengshui, Hebei), which went to Kang instead (Emperor Dezong gave Zhu two prefectures on paper, De (德州, in modern Dezhou, Shandong) and Di (棣州, in modern Binzhou, Shandong), both then still held by Li Na, and Wang believed that Emperor Dezong had reneged on the promise to reward him with the positions that Li Weiyue had wanted. He was further fearful when he received orders to provide Zhu's army with food and Ma Sui's army (which was then attacking Tian Yue) with horses, believing that Emperor Dezong might be using those orders to divert his power and getting ready to attack him next.

Tian, hearing of Zhu's disaffection, sent emissaries to Zhu to persuade him to turn against the imperial forces and aid him. Zhu agreed, and in turn sent emissaries to Wang, persuading him to join the alliance as well and agreeing to give him Shen Prefecture, which Zhu occupied at the time. Wang was pleased, and agreed to join him and Tian. (Zhu also tried to persuade Zhang to join the alliance, but Zhang refused.) When Emperor Dezong sent emissaries to order Zhu and Wang to advance south against Tian, Wang arrested the imperial emissaries and delivered them to Zhu, thus openly turning against imperial authority. Zhu, as promised, transferred control of Shen Prefecture to Wang, while sending forces to join Wang's in sieging Kang at Zhao Prefecture.

However, by this point, Tian was in desperate straits under siege from imperial forces commanded by Ma, Li Baozhen, and Li Qiu (李艽) at his capital Wei Prefecture (魏州). Zhu and Wang thus advanced south to relieve him, and as they arrived, so did additional imperial forces commanded by Li Huaiguang. Against Ma's advice of waiting until his soldiers had enough rest, Li Huaiguang decided to battle Zhu and Wang immediately. He had initial successes, but Wang cut his soldiers off from each other with a charge, leading to a major defeat for the imperial forces. Zhu and Wang then tried to cut off the imperial troops escape, but Ma then promised to request that Emperor Dezong put Zhu in charge of the entire region north of the Yellow River. Despite Wang's stern opposition, Zhu believed him and did not pursue imperial forces further, so the imperial forces were able to withdraw over a river from Wei Prefecture, and were able to take up a posture against the rebel forces, thus putting the armies into a stalemate. Zhu, seeing that he had been tricked by Ma, apologized to Wang, but Wang, while accepting the apology, thereafter resented Zhu.

In the aftermaths of the imperial forces' defeat, Tian was grateful to Zhu, and offered to subjugate himself and Wang to Zhu — in effect, offering the emperor title to Zhu. Zhu declined, crediting Wang rather than himself for the victory. At the suggestion of Zhu's staff member Li Ziqian (李子千) and Wang's staff member Zheng Ru (鄭濡), they decided to each claim a princely title to show independence from imperial authority, but keep Tang's era name in order not to completely break from Tang. On December 9, 782, in an elaborate ceremony, Zhu claimed the title of Prince of Ji; Wang claimed the title of Prince of Zhao; Tian claimed the title of Prince of Wei; and they issued a letter offering Li Na the title of Prince of Qi. They also established administrations with governmental structures paralleling the Tang imperial government to further show independence, although the titles were intentionally different from Tang's to show some subordination.

== As self-proclaimed Prince of Zhao ==
Meanwhile, though, as Zhu Tao's and Wang Wujun's troops were continuing to battle Tang imperial troops on Tian Yue's soil, all three of them were becoming financially drained. They pinned their hopes on alliance with Li Xilie, who had even greater pretensions, who was then ruling Huaixi Circuit (淮西, headquartered in modern Xuchang, Henan), which was then wealthy. They, along with Li Na, thus sent emissaries to Huaixi, suggesting to Li Xilie that he take imperial title. Li Xilie did not do so immediately, but began to claim titles greater than the ones bestowed him by Emperor Dezong. (Li Xilie would eventually declare himself to be the emperor of a new state of Chu in spring 784, although without further pledge of allegiance by the four.)

Meanwhile, in summer 783, an incident would occur to further to erode the alliance between Zhu and Wang. The imperial general Li Sheng had wanted to cut off the supply lines between Lulong and Weibo by capturing Lulong's Zhuo (涿州, in modern Baoding) and Mo (莫州, in modern Cangzhou) Prefectures, and therefore joined forces with Zhang Xiaozhong's son Zhang Shengyun (張昇雲) in sieging Zhu's general Zhang Jingji (鄭景濟) at Qingwan (清苑, in modern Baoding). Zhu left his general Ma Shi (馬寔) at Weibo and personally relieved Qingwan, defeating Li Sheng and Zhang Shengyun and forcing them to withdraw back to Yi Prefecture, under Zhang Xiaozhong's control. Upon defeating Li Sheng and Zhang Shengyun, however, Zhu did not immediately return to Weibo, and Wang sent his subordinate Song Duan (宋端) to Zhu, urging him to return to Weibo as soon as possible. When Song met Zhu, Song was harsh in his words, and Zhu threw a fit of anger—causing Wang to be fearful and to apologize to Ma in person. Zhu's angers subsided, and it was said that he continued to treat Wang as an ally, but that Wang's secret resentment toward Zhu grew even more. Wang subsequently responded to an overture by Li Baozhen into forming a secret alliance, although he also continued in alliance with Zhu, Tian, and Li Na.

In fall 783, soldiers from Jingyuan Circuit (涇原, headquartered in modern Pingliang, Gansu), then at Chang'an in preparation for deployment to the Weibo front, were angry that they were not given sufficient rewards, and they mutinied, forcing Emperor Dezong to flee to Fengtian (奉天, in modern Xianyang, Shaanxi). The mutineers supported Zhu Tao's brother Zhu Ci — who had previously served as a major imperial general but who been forced into retirement after Zhu Tao turned against the imperial government — as their leader. Zhu Ci subsequently declared himself the emperor of a new state of Qin, and he created Zhu Tao crown prince. Zhu Tao, upon receiving the communique from Zhu Ci, immediately spread the news to the other circuits in hopes that they would declare for Zhu Ci as well. Upon news of Emperor Dezong's flight to Fengtian arriving at the imperial camp at Weibo, the imperial troops scattered, with Li Huaiguang heading for Fengtian to aid Emperor Dezong, and Ma Sui, Li Baozhen, and Li Qiu returning to their respective circuits. Upon the imperial troops' withdrawal, Zhu Tao and Wang also withdrew to their own circuits. Meanwhile, Zhu Tao, who had earlier married a daughter of a Huige khan, requested aid from Huige. Huige sent 3,000 soldiers to aid Zhu Tao in his efforts to further advance south to capture the eastern capital Luoyang. However, by this point, Li Baozhen had persuaded Wang to turn against Zhu Tao — pointing out that if Zhu Tao and Zhu Ci were successful together, Wang would be under their control and further that Zhu's title of Prince of Ji showed implicit ambition to possess Wang's Ji Prefecture (冀州, in modern Hengshui). Emperor Dezong also sent messengers to Tian and Li Na, urging them to turn against Zhu Tao as well, and when Emperor Dezong declared a general pardon in spring 784 — the scope of which included even Zhu Tao, Wang, Tian, Li Na, and Li Xilie and implicitly promising them that if they submitted to nominal imperial authority again, he would not dare to interfere with them again — Wang, Tian, and Li Na all renounced their self-claimed royal titles.

== Resubmission to Emperor Dezong ==
As a result of Wang Wujun's removal of his own royal title, Emperor Dezong recommissioned him as the military governor of Chengde Circuit — adding Kang Rizhi's two prefectures to his territory, although not Zhang Xiaozhong's three prefectures. He also soon made Wang the military governor of Lulong Circuit as well, intending to use Wang's ambitions against Zhu Tao. Emperor Dezong also made Wang an honorary chancellor with the designation Tong Zhongshu Menxia Pingzhangshi (同中書門下平章事), made him Sikong (司空, one of the Three Excellencies), and created him the Prince of Langye. However, Zhu, unaware of this development, began his plan of march toward Luoyang in early 784. He went through Chengde and Weibo with great ceremonies of welcome from Wang and Tian Yue. Eventually, when Zhu reached Yongji (永濟, in modern Handan) and requested that Tian join him in advancing to Luoyang, Tian refused. This drew Zhu's anger, and he divided his troops, along with Huige troops, in attacking several different Weibo cities. Tian put up his defense at Wei Prefecture, waiting for aid; while he was doing so, he was assassinated and succeeded by his cousin Tian Xu (Tian Chengsi's son), and while Zhu rejoiced at the news and Tian Xu initially made overtures to Zhu, Tian Xu eventually continued Tian Yue's policies, continuing to be allied with imperial forces under Li Baozhen and Ma Sui. Zhu thus continued to siege two primary cities of Weibo — with Zhu himself sieging Bei Prefecture (貝州, in modern Xingtai, Hebei), defended by the Weibo general Xing Caojun (邢曹俊), and Ma Shi sieging Wei Prefecture, but could not capture either. Meanwhile, Li Baozhen and Wang had joined their forces and advanced into Weibo territory. Hearing the news, Ma Shi lifted the siege on Bei Prefecture and joined forces with Zhu. When Zhu prepared to battle Wang and Li Baozhen the next day, Ma Shi, citing the fact that his soldiers at just travelled a substantial distance, requested a few days of rest. However, the Huige general assisting Zhu, as well as Yang Bu (楊布) and Cai Xiong, advocated for immediate attack. The next day, May 29, 784, the armies battled, and the overly confident Zhu was defeated by Wang's and Li Baozhen's forces. Over 10,000 of his 30,000 soldiers were killed, and over 10,000 deserted. Zhu, with a few thousand remaining soldiers, feared annihilation at Wang's and Li Baozhen's hands and fled to De Prefecture. Wang and Li Baozhen were unable to give chase because of dense fog. After defeating Zhu, Wang returned to Heng Prefecture and declined the additional title of military governor of Lulong, and Emperor Dezong agreed. Soon, with Wang continuing to attack Zhu, Zhu resubmitted to Tang authority as well.

Meanwhile, in the aftermaths of Wang's and Li Baozhen's victory over Zhu, De and Di Prefectures, which Zhu had taken over, surrendered to Wang and were incorporated into Chengde, formally under the command of Wang's son Wang Shizhen. By 790, however, Zhao Gao (趙鎬) the prefect of Di Prefecture had offended Wang and was refusing Wang's summons. Meanwhile, there were rumors that Li Na, whom Tian Xu's older brother Tian Chao (田朝) served under as prefect of Qi Prefecture (齊州, in modern Jinan, Shandong), was planning to escort Tian Chao back to Weibo to vie for control of Weibo Circuit. Tian Xu feared this, and, under suggestion by his staff member Sun Guangzuo (孫光佐), he sent gifts to Li Na to please him and persuade him to send Tian Chao to Chang'an — and further suggested Li Na to accept Zhao's submission. Li Na therefore accepted Zhao's surrender and took Di Prefecture, despite Wang's attacks. Tian further cemented the relationship with Li Na by sending Sun to Pinglu's headquarters at Yun Prefecture (鄆州), announcing an imperial edict (which Tian Xu had forged) declaring Di Prefecture to be part of Pinglu Circuit. In anger, Wang Wujun sent his son Wang Shiqing (王士清) to attack Weibo's Bei Prefecture (貝州, in modern Xingtai, Hebei), occupying four counties of Bei Prefecture. In winter 790, Emperor Dezong, wanting to put an end to the campaigns between these circuits, ordered Li Na to return Di Prefecture to Chengde; Li Na demanded that Wang return the four counties of Bei Prefecture to Weibo first. Wang did so, and subsequently, Li Na returned Di Prefecture to Chengde.

In 792, Li Na died, and his son Li Shigu succeeded him. Wang Wujun felt that he could take advantage of Li Shigu's youth, and therefore sent an army to De and Di Prefectures, readying an attack on two Pinglu forts — Geduo (in modern Binzhou) and Sancha (三汊). Li Shigu sent Zhao to defend against the expected attack. Emperor Dezong sent eunuchs to order them to stop fighting, and thereafter Wang withdrew. Meanwhile, in 793, after an incident when Zhang Xiaozhong's son Zhang Shenglin (張昇璘), whose older brother Zhang Shengyun (張昇雲) had succeeded their father Zhang Xiaozhong as military governor of Yiwu in 791 after Zhang Xiaozhong's death and who was also a son-in-law of Li Na's, publicly cursed Wang, Wang submitted an accusation against Zhang Shenglin for disrespect. Emperor Dezong ordered that Zhang Shenglin be removed from his office as military prefect of Hai Prefecture (海州, in modern Lianyungang, Jiangsu) and detained. However, Wang used this excuse to attack Yiwu, capturing Yifeng (義豐, in modern Baoding) and seizing 10,000 people. Only after repeated apologies by Zhang Shengyun did Wang withdraw.

In 794, when Li Baozhen died, his son Li Jian (李緘) tried to take control of his Zhaoyi Circuit (昭義, headquartered in modern Changzhi, Shanxi) and sought material aid (in forms of a loan) from Wang. Wang firmly rebuked him, and subsequently, without support from neighboring circuits or Zhaoyi's own officers, Li Jian gave up his attempt to seize the circuit. In 796, Emperor Dezong bestowed on Wang the greater honorary chancellor title of Zhongshu Ling (中書令). Wang died in 801 and was posthumously honored with the same ceremony that had been used for the great general Hun Jian. Wang Shizhen succeeded him.

== Notes and references ==
- Old Book of Tang, vol. 142.
- New Book of Tang, vol. 211.
- Zizhi Tongjian, vols. 225, 226, 227, 228, 229, 230, 231, 233, 234, 235, 236.
