= Xue E =

General of the Chinese Tang dynasty

Xue E (薛崿) was a general of the Chinese Tang dynasty, briefly ruling Zhaoyi Circuit (昭義, then headquartered in modern Anyang, Henan) after the death of his brother Xue Song.

Nothing is known about Xue E's career under his brother or events before that. When Xue Song died in 773, after having ruled Zhaoyi Circuit effectively independently from the imperial government as its military governor (jiedushi), Xue Song's subordinates initially wanted to support his 11-year-old son Xue Ping to succeed him. Xue Ping pretended to agree, but one night yielded his position to Xue E, took his family, and fled back to his home territory. Emperor Daizong made Xue E the acting military governor.

In 775, Tian Chengsi, who governed nearby Weibo Circuit (魏博, headquartered in modern Handan, Hebei) and who had long had designs on Zhaoyi, induced Xue E's subordinate Pei Zhiqing (裴志清) to rise against him. Xue E fled from Zhaoyi's headquarters at Xiang Prefecture (相州) to Ming Prefecture (洺州, in modern Handan), whose prefect Xue Jian (薛堅) was a relative, and made a petition to Emperor Daizong to allow him to report to the capital Chang'an. Emperor Daizong agreed, and when Xue E arrived at Chang'an, he wore mourning clothes and begged punishment from Emperor Daizong. Emperor Daizong did not punish him, however. There was no further historical records about Xue E's activities afterwards, and it is not known when he died.
