= Zhu Tao =

Chinese general of Tang Dynasty era

Zhu Tao (朱滔) (died 785), formally the Prince of Tongyi (通義王), was a Chinese military general, monarch, rebel and politician during the Tang dynasty. He served as a general who initially served imperial causes during the reigns of Emperor Daizong and his successor Emperor Dezong, but later turned against imperial rule in alliance with Wang Wujun, Tian Yue, and Li Na. Eventually, when his brother Zhu Ci rebelled at the Tang capital Chang'an and claimed the imperial title, Zhu Tao became his crown prince, but after Zhu Ci was defeated and killed in 784, Zhu Tao submitted to Emperor Dezong again.

== Background ==
Zhu Tao was born in sometime between 744 and 748. His family was from You Prefecture (幽州, in modern Beijing). Both his great-grandfather Zhu Li (朱利) and grandfather Zhu Siming (朱思明) served as minor imperial officials. His father Zhu Huaigui (朱懷珪) served as an officer under Pei Kuan (裴寬) the military governor (Jiedushi) of Fanyang Circuit (范陽, headquartered at You Prefecture), commanding Pei's guards, and was given a general title. Zhu Huaigui later served as a general for the rebel Yan state after An Lushan, then the military governor of Fanyang, rebelled against Emperor Xuanzong's rule in 755. At the end of the rebellion, when the Yan general then in charge of Fanyang, Li Huaixian, submitted to the rule of Emperor Xuanzong's grandson Emperor Daizong, Emperor Daizong allowed Li Huaixian to remain military governor of the circuit, now renamed Lulong (盧龍). Li Huaixian made Zhu Huaigui the prefect of Ji Prefecture (薊州, in modern Tianjin), and Zhu Huaigui continued to serve under Li Huaixian until Zhu Huaigui's death in 766. Zhu Tao, along with his older brother Zhu Ci, both became officers under Li Huaixian as well.

== Service under Zhu Xicai ==
In 768, Zhu Tao and his brother Zhu Ci, as well as a colleague, Zhu Xicai, plotted to kill Li Huaixian. Under the plan, Zhu Ci and Zhu Tao arrived at Li's headquarters and killed the guards on the outside, but when Zhu Xicai did not then arrive with his troops to enter and kill Li, Zhu Ci became apprehensive and considered fleeing, staying only after Zhu Tao commented, "If our plan fails, we will die anyway. Why bother fleeing?" Zhu Xicai soon arrived, and they entered, killed Li, and slaughtered his family. Zhu Xicai claimed the title of acting military governor. The imperial government, later in the year, acquiesced and made Zhu Xicai military governor. Zhu Tao continued to serve under Zhu Xicai, and it was said that because they shared the same surname, Zhu Xicai trusted him greatly and put him in command of the headquarters guards.

Zhu Xicai, however, was said to be cruel and harsh, alienating his subordinates. In 772, Zhu Xicai's secretary Li Huaiyuan (李懷瑗), because the soldiers were angry at Zhu Xicai, assassinated him. Initially, the headquarters fell a state of confusion. Zhu Tao quickly induced his soldiers into proclaiming that the only person qualified to succeed as military governor was Zhu Ci. The other officers agreed, and Zhu Ci, who was then outside the circuit capital, was welcomed back to the capital to take over command. Zhu Ci claimed the title of acting military governor and sent messengers to the Tang capital Chang'an to report what had happened. Emperor Daizong made Zhu Ci the military governor, and Zhu Tao thereafter served under his brother.

== Service under Zhu Ci ==
At that time, the Tang western border was often subject to Tufan incursions, and the imperial governor regularly conscripted troops from the circuits to participate in defense in the fall – a season when Tufan often attacked. However, ever since the end of the Anshi Rebellion, Lulong Circuit had not submitted to such conscription. In 773, Zhu Ci, breaking that tradition and showing submission to the imperial government, sent Zhu Tao with 5,000 elite soldiers to Chang'an to participate in the fall defense. Emperor Daizong was very pleased, and he welcomed Zhu Tao in great feasts and gave him much reward. While he was conversing with Emperor Daizong, Emperor Daizong posed the question: "Are you or Zhu Ci more able?" Zhu Tao responded:

We both have strengths and weaknesses. As far as leading the soldiers and judging proper strategy, your subject is not as good as Zhu Ci. But I am 27 and am able to see the face of a dragon [(i.e., Emperor Daizong)]. Zhu Ci is five years older and has not been at the house of a phoenix [(i.e., the imperial palace)]. In this, I am better than he.

Emperor Daizong was pleased by the flattery.

Under Zhu Tao's subsequent suggestion – that going to Chang'an himself will show great faithfulness to the emperor – Zhu Ci himself offered to command the Lulong troops in fall defense in 774. Emperor Daizong agreed, and further built a large mansion for Zhu Ci in anticipation of his arrival. In fall 774, Zhu Ci, leaving Zhu Tao in acting command of Lulong, left Lulong and headed for Chang'an, and subsequently participated in the defense against Tufan later that year. After Zhu Ci left Lulong, however, even though he remained military governor, Zhu Tao killed a number of his close associates, and the relationship between the brothers deteriorated. Zhu Ci, believing that it would not be safe for him to return to Lulong, requested to remain at Chang'an. Emperor Daizong agreed, but let him keep the title of military governor while making Zhu Tao acting military governor, in effective control of the circuit.

== As acting military governor ==
By 775, one of the military governors who had only nominally been submissive to Emperor Daizong, Tian Chengsi the military governor of Weibo Circuit (魏博, headquartered in modern Handan, Hebei), had particularly offended not only the imperial government but also his fellow warlords—by seizing much of Zhaoyi Circuit (昭義, headquartered in modern Anyang, Henan) after the death of its military governor Xue Song in 773; by looking down on Li Zhengji the military governor of Pinglu Circuit (平盧, headquartered in modern Tai'an, Shandong) and Li Baochen the military governor of Chengde (成德, headquartered in modern Shijiazhuang, Hebei); and by killing Li Baochen's brother Li Baozheng (李寶正), who was also his son-in-law, after his own son Tian Wei (田維) died after colliding with Li Baozhen while playing polo. Li Baochen and Li Zhengji thus offered to attack Tian, and Emperor Daizong decided to take this opportunity to destroy the rebellious Tian. As Zhu Tao was then submissive to the imperial government, he joined forces with Li Baochen and another general loyal to the imperial government, Xue Jianxun (薛兼訓), to attack Weibo from the north, while Li Zhengji and Li Zhongchen attacked from the south. The joint forces had initial successes, but when Zhu and Li Baochen attacked Cang Prefecture (滄州, in modern Cangzhou, Hebei), which was defended by Tian's cousin Tian Tingjie (田庭玠), they could not capture it quickly. Meanwhile, Tian Chengsi had persuaded Li Zhengji to withdraw with flattery. In addition, Li Baochen was offended when an imperial eunuch, Ma Chengqian (馬承倩), who had visited Li Baochen's army, was so dissatisfied with Li Baochen's gift to him that he threw it on the ground, and Tian was also able to use hoaxes to persuade Li Baochen that if he joined forces with Tian to attack Lulong, he would be successful. Li Baochen thus turned against Zhu, launching a surprise attack on him, but was unable to kill Zhu, effectively ending any hopes of the campaign against Tian and subsequently creating an enmity between the Chengde and Lulong Circuits. Emperor Daizong was subsequently forced to reaccept Tian Chengsi's nominal submission.

In 781, Li Baochen died. His son Li Weiyue requested imperial approval to succeed him. However, with Emperor Daizong having died in 779 and been succeeded by his son Emperor Dezong, Emperor Dezong, who had wanted to take a harder line with warlords, refused. Li Weiyue and his allies—Tian Chengsi's nephew Tian Yue, who had succeeded Tian Chengsi in 779; Li Zhengji (who would himself die later in 781 and be succeeded by his son Li Na, without imperial approval); and Liang Chongyi the military governor of Shannan East Circuit (山南東道, headquartered in modern Xiangfan, Hebei), prepared for war against the imperial government. As part of the imperial countermeasures, Emperor Dezong ordered Zhu to attack Chengde from the north. Zhu thus launched his army and headed for Yi Prefecture (易州, in modern Shijiazhuang), defended by the capable Chengde general Zhang Xiaozhong. Zhu sent his secretary Cai Xiong (蔡雄) to persuade Zhang that the imperial forces would soon be able to destroy Chengde and Weibo and that he should join the imperial cause. Zhang agreed and surrendered. Zhu then submitted a recommendation that Zhang be named the military governor of Chengde (even though most of Chengde was then still in Li Weiyue's control), and Emperor Dezong agreed. In gratitude, Zhang had his son Zhang Maohe (張茂和) marry Zhu's daughter, and Zhu Tao and Zhang Xiaozhong formed a friendship.

In spring 782, Zhu Tao and Zhang Xiaozhong captured Shulu (束鹿, in modern Shijiazhuang). Li Weiyue, in fear, considered submitting to the imperial government and giving up Chengde, but after Tian Yue found out, he angrily demanded the death of Li Weiyue's secretary Shao Zhen (邵真), who had recommended submission; Li Weiyue killed Shao and sent an army, commanded by the Weibo officer Meng You (孟祐) and his own officer Wang Wujun, to try to recapture Shulu. The joint Zhu and Zhang forces, however, defeated Li Weiyue's forces—as Wang was apprehensive that if he prevailed, Li Weiyue would be without apprehension and would kill him after his return, as Li Weiyue had also been fearful of him. Zhu wanted to continue on to the capital of Chengde, Heng Prefecture, but stopped his advances when, to his surprise, Zhang backed off and withdrew to Yifeng (義豐, in modern Baoding, Hebei). (When his subordinates questioned this move, Zhang stated his reasons—that if they pressured Heng Prefecture, the officers inside would be united to fight against the attack, while he expected that without such pressure, the officers inside would kill Li Weiyue and surrender; and that he believed Zhu to be too much of a bragger and an unreliable ally. As Zhang predicted, Wang, once he returned to Heng Prefecture, started an uprising and killed Li Weiyue and surrendered. In the aftermaths of Li Weiyue's death, Li Weiyue's brother-in-law Yang Rongguo (楊榮國), who had been defending Shen Prefecture (深州, in modern Hengshui, Hebei), surrendered to Zhu.

After the victory at Chengde, however, Emperor Dezong made a series of moves that simultaneously alienated Zhu and Wang. He refused to give Shen Prefecture to Lulong, as Zhu had requested. Rather, he divided the seven prefectures of Chengde into three smaller circuits, making Zhang the military governor of a newly created Yidingcang Circuit (易定滄, headquartered in modern Baoding, soon renamed to Yiwu (義武)), consisting of three prefectures, while giving two prefectures each to Wang and Kang Rizhi (康日知, another Chengde general who had submitted to imperial authority during the campaign), with the lesser titles of military prefect (團練使, Tuanlianshi). Emperor Dezong, on paper, gave Lulong two additional prefectures—De (德州, in modern Dezhou, Shandong) and Di (棣州, in modern Binzhou, Shandong)—both still then held by Li Na. Zhu was angered by Emperor Dezong's refusal to give him any part of Chengde territory (in particular, Shen Prefecture) and requiring him to capture two additional prefectures on his own, while Wang was angered that contrary to Emperor Dezong's implicit promises to give whoever killed Li Weiyue Li Weiyue's offices, he not only received a lesser title, but was in a position where he could easily be destroyed. Tian Yue, who was then still under imperial attack, thus persuaded Zhu and Wang to join him in an alliance to defend against imperial forces. Zhu and Wang both agreed, although when Zhu further tried to persuade Zhang to join the alliance as well, Zhang refused. When, in summer 784, Li Na's officer Li Shizhen (李士真) surrendered to imperial forces with De and Di Prefectures, Zhu seized Li Shizhen and the control of those two prefectures anyway, although at this point he had not made a clear break with the imperial government.

When, shortly after, Emperor Dezong issued an edict ordering that Lulong, Yidingcang, and Wang's Hengji Circuit (恆冀) attack Tian Yue from the north, Wang arrested the imperial messengers and delivered them to Zhu. Zhu thereafter declared to his subordinates that they were going to head south to attack, not to help, the imperial forces. His officers initially resisted the declaration, forcing him to postpone the action and to kill a number of them. Emperor Dezong, hearing this, tried to placate Zhu by creating him the Prince of Tongyi and exiling several officials whom Zhu had grudges against, but this did not stop Zhu's resolve. Zhu subsequently also sent secret messages to Zhu Ci, who was then defending the important border city Fengxiang (鳳翔, in modern Baoji, Shaanxi), asking him to rise as well. When this was discovered, Emperor Dezong did not punish Zhu Ci but recalled him to Chang'an. Zhu Tao and Wang subsequently joined their forces and headed south, to try to save Tian Yue, then under siege by imperial forces at Weibo's capital Wei Prefecture. When they arrived at Wei Prefecture, they dealt a severe defeat to the imperial generals Ma Sui and Li Huaiguang, forcing the imperial forces to lift the siege on Wei Prefecture. Wang suggested pursuit, but Zhu, believing in Ma's subsequent message that he was willing to submit and request that Emperor Dezong grant Zhu the powers to deal with all lands north of the Yellow River, stopped the pursuit. When Ma subsequently regrouped and refused to submit, Zhu apologized to Wang, but it was said that Wang thus bore a grudge against Zhu from this point on.

In the aftermaths of the imperial forces' defeat, Tian was grateful to Zhu, and offered to subjugate himself and Wang to Zhu—in effect, offering the emperor title to Zhu. Zhu declined, crediting Wang rather than himself for the victory. At the suggestion of Zhu's staff member Li Ziqian (李子千) and Wang's staff member Zheng Ru (鄭濡), they decided to each claim a princely title to show independence from imperial authority, but keep Tang's era name in order not to completely break from Tang. On December 9, 782, in an elaborate ceremony, Zhu claimed the title of Prince of Ji; Wang claimed the title of Prince of Zhao; Tian claimed the title of Prince of Wei; and they issued a letter offering Li Na the title of Prince of Qi. They also established administrations with governmental structures paralleling the Tang imperial government to further show independence, although the titles were intentionally different from Tang's to show some subordination.

== As self-proclaimed Prince of Ji ==
Meanwhile, though, as Zhu Tao's and Wang Wujun's troops were continuing to battle Tang imperial troops on Tian Yue's soil, all three of them were becoming financially drained. They pinned their hopes on alliance with yet another military governor with greater pretensions – Li Xilie the military governor of Huaixi Circuit (淮西, headquartered in modern Xuchang, Henan), whose circuit was then wealthy. They, along with Li Na, thus sent emissaries to Huaixi, suggesting to Li Xilie that he take imperial title. Li Xilie did not do so immediately, but began to claim titles greater than the ones bestowed him by Emperor Dezong. (Li Xilie would eventually declare himself to be the emperor of a new state of Chu in spring 784, although without further pledge of allegiance by the four.)

Meanwhile, in summer 783, an incident would occur to begin to erode the alliance between Zhu and Wang. The imperial general Li Sheng had wanted to cut off the supply lines between Lulong and Weibo by capturing Lulong's Zhuo (涿州, in modern Baoding) and Mo (莫州, in modern Cangzhou) Prefectures, and therefore joined forces with Zhang Xiaozhong's son Zhang Shengyun (張昇雲) in sieging Zhu's general Zhang Jingji (鄭景濟) at Qingwan (清苑, in modern Baoding). Zhu left his general Ma Shi (馬寔) at Weibo and personally relieved Qingwan, defeating Li Sheng and Zhang Shengyun and forcing them to withdraw back to Yi Prefecture, under Zhang Xiaozhong's control. Upon defeating Li Sheng and Zhang Shengyun, however, Zhu did not immediately return to Weibo, and Wang sent his subordinate Song Duan (宋端) to Zhu, urging him to return to Weibo as soon as possible. When Song met Zhu, Song was harsh in his words, and Zhu threw a fit of anger – causing Wang to be fearful and to apologize to Ma in person. Zhu's angers subsided, and it was said that he continued to treat Wang as an ally, but that Wang's secret resentment toward Zhu grew even more. Wang subsequently responded to an overture by the imperial general Li Baozhen into forming a secret alliance, although he also continued in alliance with Zhu, Tian, and Li Na.

In fall 783, soldiers from Jingyuan Circuit (涇原, headquartered in modern Pingliang, Gansu), then at Chang'an in preparation for deployment to the Weibo front, were angry that they were not given sufficient rewards, and they mutinied, forcing Emperor Dezong to flee to Fengtian (奉天, in modern Xianyang, Shaanxi). The mutineers supported Zhu Ci—who had been forced into retirement after Zhu Tao turned against the imperial government—as their leader. Zhu Ci subsequently declared himself the emperor of a new state of Qin, and he created Zhu Tao crown prince. Zhu Tao, upon receiving the communique from Zhu Ci, immediately spread the news to the other circuits in hopes that they would declare for Zhu Ci as well. Upon news of Emperor Dezong's flight to Fengtian arriving at the imperial camp at Weibo, the imperial troops scattered, with Li Huaiguang heading for Fengtian to aid Emperor Dezong, and Ma Sui, Li Baozhen, and Li Qiu (李艽) returning to their respective circuits. Upon the imperial troops' withdrawal, Zhu Tao and Wang also withdrew to their own circuits. Meanwhile, Zhu Tao, who had earlier married a daughter of a Huige khan, requested aid from Huige. Huige sent 3,000 soldiers to aid Zhu Tao in his efforts to further advance south to capture the eastern capital Luoyang. However, by this point, Li Baozhen had persuaded Wang to turn against Zhu Tao—pointing out that if Zhu Tao and Zhu Ci were successful together, Wang would be under their control and further that Zhu's title of Prince of Ji showed implicit ambition to possess Wang's Ji Prefecture (冀州, in modern Hengshui, a different Ji Prefecture than the one that Zhu Tao's father Zhu Huaigui had been the prefect of). Emperor Dezong also sent messengers to Tian and Li Na, urging them to turn against Zhu Tao as well, and when Emperor Dezong declared a general pardon in spring 784—the scope of which included even Zhu Tao, Wang, Tian, Li Na, and Li Xilie and implicitly promising them that if they submitted to nominal imperial authority again, he would not dare to interfere with them again—Wang, Tian, and Li Na all renounced their self-claimed royal titles.

However, Zhu Tao, unaware of this development, began his plan of march toward Luoyang in early 784. He went through Hengji and Weibo with great ceremonies of welcome from Wang and Tian. Eventually, when Zhu reached Yongji (永濟, in modern Handan) and requested that Tian join him in advancing to Luoyang, Tian refused. This drew Zhu's anger, and he divided his troops, along with Huige troops, in attacking several different Weibo cities. Tian put up his defense at Wei Prefecture, waiting for aid; while he was doing so, he was assassinated and succeeded by his cousin Tian Xu (Tian Chengsi's son), and while Zhu rejoiced at the news and Tian Xu initially made overtures to Zhu, Tian Xu eventually continued Tian Yue's policies, continuing to be allied with imperial forces under Li Baozhen and Ma Sui. Zhu thus continued to siege two primary cities of Weibo—with Zhu himself sieging Bei Prefecture (貝州, in modern Xingtai, Hebei), defended by the Weibo general Xing Caojun (邢曹俊), and Ma Shi sieging Wei Prefecture, but could not capture either. Meanwhile, Li Baozhen and Wang had joined their forces and advanced into Weibo territory. Hearing the news, Ma Shi lifted the siege on Bei Prefecture and joined forces with Zhu. When Zhu prepared to battle Wang and Li Baozhen the next day, Ma Shi, citing the fact that his soldiers at just travelled a substantial distance, requested a few days of rest. However, the Huige general assisting Zhu, as well as Yang Bu (楊布) and Cai Xiong, advocated for immediate attack. The next day, May 29, 784, the armies battled, and the overly confident Zhu was defeated by Wang's and Li Baozhen's forces. Over 10,000 of his 30,000 soldiers were killed, and over 10,000 deserted. Zhu, with a few thousand remaining soldiers, feared annihilation at Wang's and Li Baozhen's hands and fled to De Prefecture. Wang and Li Baozhen were unable to give chase because of dense fog. Zhu executed Yang and Cai and decided to return to You Prefecture, where he had left his cousin Liu Peng in charge—but as he did so, he feared that Liu would take advantage and seize power. However, when he returned to You Prefecture, Liu mobilized the remaining troops and exited the city to welcome him in grand ceremony.

== As Tang subject again ==
Meanwhile, as Zhu Tao continued to be under attack by Wang Wujun (who was, briefly, given the additional title as military governor of Lulong by Emperor Dezong, whose forces had since defeated Zhu Ci and who had returned to Chang'an, in order to pressure Zhu Tao), so he sent an apologetic offer to submit to Emperor Dezong again. Emperor Dezong issued an edict accepting the resubmission and restoring his offices. He died in 785 and was given posthumous honors despite the campaigns and mutiny that he had waged against the imperial government. Liu Peng succeeded him.

== Notes and references ==
- New Book of Tang, vol. 212.
- Zizhi Tongjian, vols. 224, 225, 227, 228, 229, 230, 231.
