= Li Xilie =

Chinese general

- Reign: 784 – May 9, 786
- Born: unknown
- Died: May 9, 786
Full name
- Family name: Li (李); Given name: Xīliè (希烈)
Era name and dates
- Wǔchéng (武成): 784 – May 9, 786
- Dynasty: Chǔ (楚)
- Occupation: Military general, monarch, politician

Li Xilie (Chinese: 李希烈; died May 9, 786) was a Chinese military general, monarch, and politician of the medieval Tang dynasty who, believing himself to be strong enough to claim imperial title, did so as the emperor of a new state of Chu. His efforts to expand Chu was repeatedly thwarted by generals loyal to Tang, however, in 786, after he grew ill, he was killed with poison by his general Chen Xianqi.

== Background ==
It is not known when Li Xilie was born, but it is known that his family was from Yan Prefecture (燕州, in modern Siping, Jilin), and that his father's name was Dading (大定). His surname might have been originally Dong. It was said that he joined the army of Pinglu Circuit (平盧, then headquartered in modern Chaoyang, Liaoning). During the Anshi Rebellion, when part of the Pinglu army was led by Li Zhongchen — then still named Dong Qin and who might have been Li Xilie's father's cousin — across the Bohai Sea, to join the campaign against the rebel Yan state north of the Yellow River. Later, after Li Zhongchen was made the military governor (Jiedushi) of Huaixi Circuit (淮西, headquartered in modern Zhumadian, Henan), Li Xilie followed him there and served under him.

As of 779, Li Zhongchen was said to be greedy, violent, and sexually immoral. If his officers and soldiers had beautiful wives or daughters, he would often force the women to have sexual relations with him. He entrusted the important matters of the circuit to his brother-in-law Zhang Huiguang (張惠光), whom he made his deputy. Zhang was said to be corrupt and causing much grief to the soldiers. Zhang's son, an officer, was even more corrupt than his father. Li Xilie was supported by the soldiers, and he took this opportunity to plot a mutiny with his colleague Ding Gao (丁暠). On March 28, 779, Li Xilie and Ding killed Zhang and his son and expelled Li Zhongchen. Li Zhongchen fled to Chang'an. Emperor Daizong, crediting him for his past achievements, kept him at Chang'an and gave him the honorary title of acting Sikong (司空, one of the Three Excellencies) and allowed him to exercise his previously honorary authorities as a chancellor. He made Li Xilie prefect of Huaixi's capital Cai Prefecture (蔡州) and acting military governor (nominally serving under Emperor Daizong's own son Li Zao (李造) the Prince of Xin), but stripped the circuit of Bian (汴州, in modern Kaifeng, Henan) and Ying (潁州, in modern Fuyang, Anhui) Prefectures, transferring them to Yongping Circuit (永平) under Li Mian's command, moving Yongping's headquarters to Bian Prefecture. After Emperor Daizong died later in the year and was succeeded by his son Emperor Dezong, Emperor Dezong formally made Li Xilie the military governor of Huaixi.

== As Jiedushi of Huaixi Circuit ==
=== In imperial service ===
Li Xilie subsequently drew favors from Emperor Dezong by repeatedly suggesting to Emperor Dezong, who had wanted to wipe out the de facto independence of several circuits — Pinglu (the original territory of which had been abandoned and whose headquartered had moved to modern Tai'an, Shandong), ruled by Li Zhengji; Weibo (魏博, headquartered in modern Handan, Hebei), ruled by Tian Yue; Chengde (成德, headquartered in modern Shijiazhuang, Hebei), ruled by Li Baochen; and Shannan East (山南東道, headquartered in modern Xiangfan, Hubei), ruled by Liang Chongyi — that he be allowed to attack Liang and take Shannan East Circuit back for the imperial government. In 781, after Li Baochen died, Emperor Dezong refused to let his son Li Weiyue inherit his position, and the military governors of the de facto independent circuits, who were aligned with each other, then prepared for war against imperial causes. However, Liang was in the worst strategic position among these circuits, as his was the weakest circuit among them and was surrounded by circuits obeying imperial orders, and therefore he did not take as provocative gestures as the others. Nevertheless, Emperor Dezong, not wanting to take any chances, effectively gave Liang the choice of submission or fight by issuing an order promoting him but summoning him to the capital Chang'an. Liang, after much deliberation, refused and planned for war.

In summer 781, Emperor Dezong created Li Xilie the Prince of Nanping and put him in command of overall operations against Liang — against warnings by the chancellor Yang Yan that, based on how Li Xilie had turned against Li Zhongchen, he could not be trusted. Instead, Emperor Dezong publicly praised Li Xilie for his loyalty — although this drew a private remark from his official Li Cheng (李承) that he believed that Li Xilie would turn arrogant and defiant if he were to defeat Liang. Subsequently, when Li Xilie's advances were slowed by torrential rains, Yang Yan's fellow chancellor and political enemy Lu Qi secretly suggested to Emperor Dezong that Li Xilie had slowed down due to his displeasure with Yang; as a result, Emperor Dezong removed Yang from his chancellor post. Meanwhile, Liang launched a preemptive attack against Jiangling, hoping to capture it and gain access to the south. However, he was defeated at Siwang (四望, in modern Xiangfan) and retreated back to Shannan East's capital Xiang Prefecture. He gathered his troops and concentrated them in Xiang and Deng Prefectures, while Li Xilie gathered the forces and headed northwest on the Han River toward Xiang Prefecture. Liang attacked some of Li Xilie's troops stationed at Linhan (臨漢, near Xiang Prefecture), slaughtering them, but subsequently, when Li Xilie's main troops arrived, Liang's generals Zhai Hui (翟暉) and Du Shaocheng (杜少誠) was defeated by Li Xilie at Man River (蠻水, flowing through modern Xiangfan) and then Shukou (疎口, also in modern Xiangfan). Zhai and Du surrendered to Li Xilie, and Li Xilie ordered them to take their troops to enter Xiangyang (the capital of Xiang Prefecture) first. Liang ordered resistance, but his troops opened the gates and fled outside. Liang, seeing no escape, committed suicide with his wife and children by jumping into a well. Li Xilie took his body out from the well, cut off the head, and sent it to Chang'an. Li Xilie also slaughtered Liang's relatives and friends, as well as 3,000 soldiers who had participated in the Battle of Linhan. Emperor Dezong granted Li Xilie the honorary chancellor designation of Tong Zhongshu Menxia Pingzhangshi (同中書門下平章事).

=== Turning against imperial rule ===
After Li Xilie's victory over Liang, instead of turning Shannan East over to imperial authority, he began to act as if it were his private domain. Emperor Dezong, remembering Li Cheng's remarks, sent Li Cheng to Shannan East to serve as military governor — with no escorts, at Li Cheng's own request. Once Li Cheng got to Xiang Prefecture, Li Xilie initially refused to let him take over its governance and housed him at a pavilion for guests, and then tried to intimidate him with threats. Li Cheng refused to leave, and Li Xilie, unwilling to break with the imperial government at that time, allowed his soldiers to pillage Xiang Prefecture and then withdrew back to Huaixi. In 782, with imperial forces engaging the forces of Tian Yue, Wang Wujun, Zhu Tao (both Wang and Zhu having participated in Li Weiyue's destruction earlier but then rebelled in light of Emperor Dezong's failure to grant them territory that they wanted), and Li Na (Li Zhengji's son, who had taken over after Li Zhengji died later in 781 as well), Emperor Dezong made Li Xilie the military governor of Pinglu, intending to have him attack Li Na. Li Xilie, however, was in secret communication with the four rebels, who had declared themselves princes independent of Tang, and he, under the guise of attacking Li Na, moved his headquarters to Xu Prefecture (許州, in modern Xuchang, Henan) and requested permission from Li Mian the military governor of Yongping Circuit (永平, headquartered in modern Kaifeng, Henan) to pass through his territory. Li Mian, suspecting Li Xilie's intentions, granted permission but put his forces on high alert. Li Xilie, realizing that Li Mian was on guard, did not attack him. However, Li Xilie then claimed several titles that had not been granted him by Emperor Dezong — the supreme commander of the armed forces, Taiwei (太尉, one of the Three Excellencies), and the Prince of Jianxing.

In spring 783, Li Xilie finally took more apparent provocative action against the imperial government, by capturing Ru Prefecture (汝州, in modern Luoyang, Henan) and its acting prefect Li Yuanping (李元平). He then sent his forces to raid the nearby prefectures. At the suggestion of Lu Qi — who had been resentful of the senior official Yan Zhenqing — Emperor Dezong sent Yan to Huaixi to make one final attempt to persuade Li Xilie to return to the imperial fold. Once Yan arrived at Huaixi, Li Xilie put him under house arrest, albeit at a comfortable pavilion, and refused his demands that Li Xilie return to the imperial fold. Li Xilie cut off the communication lines between Chang'an and the Yangtze River-Huai River region, forcing Tang official communications to go through the middle Yangtze region. His subsequent attempts to expand, however, were repelled by Tang generals Geshu Yao (哥舒曜) and Li Gao (李皋) the Prince of Cao, and his campaign stalled. An attempt by his subordinate Zhou Zeng (周曾) to overthrow him and replace him with Yan, however, failed. In light of Zhou's failure, however, Li Xilie made one attempt to reconcile with Emperor Dezong, sending an apology that blamed his own rebellion on Zhou, and then moving his headquarters back to Cai Prefecture, where he felt more secure. For the next several months, he continued to engage imperial troops and raid the surrounding prefectures, but did not undertake any substantial maneuvers to expand.

In fall 783, soldiers of Jingyuan Circuit (涇原, headquartered in modern Pingliang, Gansu), at Chang'an at the time in preparation for deployment to battle Zhu, Tian, Wang, and Li Na, mutinied, forcing Emperor Dezong to flee to Fengtian (奉天, in modern Xianyang, Shaanxi). They supported Zhu Tao's brother Zhu Ci as their leader, and Zhu Ci soon declared himself the emperor of a new state of Qin. In the subsequent confusion, Xiangcheng (襄城, in modern Xuchang), which Geshu was defending, fell to Li Xilie, and Geshu fled back to Luoyang. Later in 783, Li Xilie attacked Li Mian's headquarters at Bian Prefecture, but could not capture it quickly enough. He forcibly conscripted civilians to participate in the siege and, when they could not complete the filling-up of the moat around Bian Prefecture on time, buried them alive, referring to them as "wet wood." Around the new year 784, Li Mian abandoned Bian Prefecture, which then fell to Li Xilie, who then moved his headquarters to Bian Prefecture. Li Mian's subordinate Li Cheng (李澄, note different character than the Li Cheng who had previously resisted Li Xilie) surrendered Hua Prefecture (滑州, in modern Anyang, Henan) to Li Xilie as well. The Yangtze-Huai region was all shocked by the development, and Chen Shaoyou (陳少游) the military governor of Huainan Circuit (淮南, headquartered in modern Yangzhou, Jiangsu) sent his subordinate Wen Shu (溫述) to Li Xilie to pledge allegiance to Li Xilie.

When Emperor Dezong, still at Fengtian, declared a general pardon in spring 784 — the scope of which included even Zhu Tao, Wang, Tian, Li Na, and Li Xilie and implicitly promising them that if they submitted to nominal imperial authority again, he would not dare to interfere with them again — Wang, Tian, and Li Na all renounced their self-claimed princely titles. Li Xilie refused, however, and declared himself the emperor of a new state of Chu and making Daliang (i.e., Bian Prefecture) his capital.

== As emperor of Chu ==
After Li Xilie declared himself the Emperor of Chu, he sent emissaries to Chen Shaoyou and Zhang Jianfeng the prefect of Shou Prefecture (壽州, in modern Lu'an, Anhui), trying to get them to formally submit. Chen was receptive, but Zhang was not and killed Li Xilie's emissaries. Li Xilie sent his general Du Shaocheng (杜少誠) to attack Zhang, but was defeated by Zhang. Other efforts by him to expand were also repelled by Li Gao and Li Jian (李兼) the prefect of E Prefecture (鄂州, in modern Wuhan, Hubei). Meanwhile, when Li Xilie himself attacked Ningling (寧陵, in modern Shangqiu, Henan) and called on Li Cheng to aid him, Li Cheng refused. When Ningling's defender Liu Chang (劉昌) received archery reinforcements from Han Huang the military governor of Zhejiang West Circuit (浙江西道, headquartered in modern Zhenjiang, Jiangsu), Li Xilie was forced to lift the siege on Ningling and withdraw.

In late 784, the Tang general Li Sheng recaptured Chang'an and welcomed Emperor Dezong back to Chang'an. Li Xilie's brother Li Xiqian (李希倩), who had been serving under Zhu Ci, was executed. Hearing of Li Xiqian's death, in anger, Li Xilie executed Yan Zhenqing. Meanwhile, when he subsequently had difficulty in capturing Chen Prefecture (陳州, in modern Zhoukou, Henan), Li Cheng openly turned against him and resubmitted to Tang. Tang forces under Li Cheng, Liu Qia (劉洽), and Qu Huan (曲環) then converged on Bian Prefecture, and Li Xilie, in fear, left Bian Prefecture and moved his capital back to Cai Prefecture. Li Xilie's general Tian Huaizhen (田懷珍) then surrendered Bian Prefecture to Tang forces. Li Xilie was able to capture Deng Prefecture (鄧州, in modern Nanyang, Henan) in spring 785, but made no major gains thereafter. In fall 785, Emperor Dezong, at the advice of the chancellor Lu Zhi, issued an edict that ordered the surrounding circuits not to take further aggressive actions against Chu, but merely to defend themselves against Chu attacks. He also promised that if Li Xilie surrendered, his life would be spared. Li Xilie did not respond. His further attacks continued to be repelled by Tang generals, however, and it was said that his territory was constantly shrinking.

In spring 786, Li Xilie grew ill after eating beef. At the encouragement of his concubine Lady Dou, who was a friend of the wife of Li Xilie's general Chen Xianqi, Chen induced Li Xilie's physician to poison him to death. Li Xilie's son subsequently tried to take over control of the circuit and again pledge allegiance to Tang, but Chen killed him, along with Li Xilie's wife, sons, and brothers, and then resubmitted to Tang imperial authority.

== Personal information ==
- Father
  - Li?/Dong? Dading (李/董大定)
- Wife
  - Name unknown (killed by Chen Xianqi 786)
- Major concubine
  - Lady Dou, daughter of Dou Liang (竇良) (killed by Wu Shaocheng 786)
- Children
  - five sons, names unknown (killed by Chen Xianqi 786)

== Notes and references ==
- Old Book of Tang, vol. 145.
- New Book of Tang, vol. 225, part 2.
- Zizhi Tongjian, vols. 225, 226, 227, 228, 229, 230, 231, 232.

Regnal titles
Preceded by Emperor Dezong of Tang	Emperor of China (Southern/Eastern Henan); 784–786	Succeeded by Emperor Dezong of Tang
