= Tian Chengsi =

Chinese Tang dynasty general and former rebel (705-779)

- Chinese: 田承嗣
Transcriptions
Standard Mandarin
- Hanyu Pinyin: Tián Chéngsì
- Wade–Giles: T‘ien Ch‘êng-ssu

Other names

Prince of Yanmen
- Traditional Chinese: 雁門王 鴈門王
- Simplified Chinese: 雁门王
- Literal meaning: King of Wild Goose Pass; Prince of Wild Goose Pass
Transcriptions
Standard Mandarin
- Hanyu Pinyin: Yànménwáng
- Wade–Giles: Yen-mên Wang

Tian Chengsi (705 – March 4, 779), noble title Prince of Yanmen, was a Chinese military general, monarch, and politician. He served as a military general in the Chinese Yan rebel state. who later submitted to and became a general of the Tang dynasty, from which Yan had rebelled. As was in the case of several other Yan generals who submitted to Tang but who had substantial army and territorial holdings, Tian was allowed to retain his command and territory, semi-independent from the Tang imperial government structure. Among these generals, he was particularly defiant of the Tang imperial government.

== Background ==
Tian Chengsi was born in 705, during the reign of Emperor Zhongzong of Tang. His family was from Ping Prefecture (平州, roughly modern Qinhuangdao, Hebei), and his ancestors, for several generations, had served in the military. His grandfather Tian Jing (田璟) and father Tian Shouyi (田守義) both had reputations for upholding justice in the region. Late in the reign of Emperor Zhongzong's nephew Emperor Xuanzong, Tian Chengsi served as a forward commanding officer under the general An Lushan, the military governor (jiedushi) of Fanyang Circuit (范陽, headquartered in modern Beijing), and particularly impressed An with his ability to maintain strict military discipline. For his contributions in campaigns against the Khitan and the Xi tribes, he was promoted several times, eventually to be a general under An.

== During Anshi Rebellion ==
An Lushan rebelled against Emperor Xuanzong's rule in late 755 and, on his campaign south to attack the Tang eastern capital Luoyang, had Tian, along with An Zhongzhi and Zhang Xiaozhong, serve as his forward commanders. An's forces quickly captured Luoyang, and he declared himself the emperor of a new state of Yan there. In 757, after An Lushan had been assassinated and succeeded by his son An Qingxu, Tian continued to serve under An Qingxu and commanded a campaign to capture the key Tang city of Nanyang (南陽, in modern Nanyang, Henan) and then to attack south further, but while he trapped the Tang commander Lu Jiong (魯炅) in Nanyang, he was not able to capture the city quickly, and after Lu eventually fought his way out of the siege and fled to Xiangyang, Tian abandoned the campaign as well and returned to Luoyang.

In fall 757, a joint Tang and Huige army commanded by Li Chu the Prince of Chu (the son of Emperor Xuanzong's son and successor Emperor Suzong recaptured Chang'an, forcing An Qingxu to flee north of the Yellow River. At that time, Tian was attacking the Tang general Lai Tian (來瑱) at Yingchuan (潁川, in modern Xuchang, Henan), and upon hearing the news, he initially offered to surrender to the Tang general Guo Ziyi, but after Guo did not react immediately, Tian changed his mind and fled north as well with another Yan general, Wu Lingxun (武令珣) to join An Qingxu at Yecheng.

In fall 758, Tang forces closed in on Yecheng. An Qingxu had himself, Tian, and Cui Qianyou (崔乾祐) command the Yan army to fight against the converging Tang forces, but Tang forces defeated them, forcing them to withdraw within the city to defend against the siege. It was only in 759, when Shi Siming fought an inconclusive battle near Yecheng that forced Tang forces to withdraw, that the siege on Yecheng was lifted. Shi then killed An Qingxu and took over the Yan throne himself, and Tian continued to serve under Shi. Shi soon advanced south with Tian as a forward commander and recaptured Luoyang. In winter 760, as part of a campaign to capture Tang territory, Shi sent Tian to the Huaixi region (淮西, i.e., modern southern Henan), but little is known about how successful the campaign was.

Shi Siming was himself assassinated by his son Shi Chaoyi in 761, and Shi Chaoyi took the throne. After a Tang and Huige joint force again recaptured Luoyang in fall 762, Tian withdrew his force and joined Shi Chaoyi at Wei Prefecture (衛州, roughly modern Puyang, Henan) to fight against the Tang forces commanded by Pugu Huai'en, but Pugu defeated them, forcing them to further flee north. Yan generals began to desert Shi Chaoyi en masse, but for some time, Tian did not, and by the time around new year 762, he was under siege in Mo Prefecture (莫州, in modern Cangzhou, Hebei) with Shi Chaoyi. He proposed to Shi Chaoyi that Shi Chaoyi head to You Prefecture (幽州, i.e., the headquarters of Fanyang Circuit) to seek reinforcements, and that he would stay and defend Mo Prefecture. Shi Chaoyi agreed, but as soon as Shi Chaoyi left Mo Prefecture, Tian turned against him and surrendered Mo Prefecture to Tang, presenting Shi Chaoyi's empress dowager, empress, and children to Tang. Shi Chaoyi, finding the situation hopeless, committed suicide in flight.

The Tang imperial government was unsure as to what to do with the main Yan generals who surrendered and feared that removing them would lead to another rebellion. At Pugu's suggestion, Li Chu, who had by this point succeeded Emperor Suzong as emperor (as Emperor Daizong), made four key Yan generals—Tian, Xue Song, Li Huaixian, and An Zhongzhi (whose name had been changed to Li Baochen by this point)—military governors and allowed them to keep their armies and posts. In Tian's case, he was given five prefectures, which were made into Weibo Circuit (魏博, headquartered in modern Handan, Hebei).

== After Anshi Rebellion ==
It was said that Tian Chengsi emphasized greatly on military strength, that as soon as he had full control of Weibo Circuit, he imposed heavy taxes and conscripted the men for the army and logistics service—and that within a year, his army was some 100,000 strong. Among this he selected an elite group, known as the Yabing (牙兵), to protect himself. The four former Yan generals formed alliances among themselves, as well as with two other military governors, Li Zhengji and Liang Chongyi, hoping to be able to pass their territories to their descendants, semi-independent from the Tang imperial government, retaining their armies and taxes without submitting them to the imperial government. As part of this alliance, Li Baochen's brother Li Baozheng (李寶正) married Tian's daughter.

By 773, Tian was demanding to be given a title of honorary chancellor, and he had also built a temple dedicated to the four Yan emperors (An Lushan, An Qingxu, Shi Siming, Shi Chaoyi). Emperor Daizong sent an eunuch messenger, Sun Zhigu (孫知古), to Weibo to persuade Tian to destroy the temple. When Tian did, Emperor Daizong rewarded him with the honorary chancellor title of Tong Zhongshu Menxia Pingzhangshi (同中書門下平章事), and also created him the Prince of Yanmen. In 774, Emperor Daizong also promised to give his daughter Princess Yongle to Tian's son Tian Hua (田華) in marriage, hoping that this would improve the relationship with Tian, but Tian became increasingly arrogant thereafter.

Meanwhile, Tian's alliance with the other generals was disrupted by his actions. Xue Song, who controlled Zhaoyi Circuit (昭義, headquartered in Anyang, Henan) had died in 773 and was initially succeeded by his son Xue Ping, who however yielded then to Xue Song's brother Xue E. In spring 775, however, Tian induced Zhaoyi's officer Pei Zhiqing (裴志清) to expel Xue E and submit to him. Tian thus captured Zhaoyi's capital prefecture Xiang Prefecture easily. He was then able to seize three more of Zhaoyi's six prefectures, while the imperial government retained the two other prefectures and merged it with the nearby Zelu Prefecture (澤潞, headquartered in modern Changzhi, Shanxi), maintaining the name of Zhaoyi for the merged circuit. Meanwhile, he also looked down at both Li Baochen and Li Zhengji. In or shortly before 775, there was an incident where Li Baozheng and Tian's son Tian Wei (田維) were playing polo at Weibo, when an accidental collision between Li Baozheng's and Tian Wei's horses killed Tian Wei. Tian Chengsi, in anger, imprisoned Li Baozheng and sent a messenger to Li Baochen in protest. Li Baochen, wanting to be conciliatory, sent a cane back with Tian's messenger and allowed Tian to discipline Li Baozheng—but Tian, in anger over his son's death, caned Li Baozheng to death, causing Li Baochen to break off the alliance with Tian. He and Li Zhengji, who also felt slighted by Tian, submitted petitions to the imperial government asking to attack Tian, and Emperor Daizong agreed, launching troops from a number of circuits loyal to the imperial government, in addition to Li Baochen's and Li Zhengji's forces, to attack Tian. Li Baochen, Zhu Tao (whose brother Zhu Ci had killed Zhu Xicai in 772, submitted Lulong to Tang imperial authority, and went to Chang'an to serve as chancellor, leaving Zhu Tao in command of Lulong), and Xue Jianxun (薛兼訓) the military governor of Taiyuan Circuit attacked Tian from the north, while Li Zhengji and Li Zhongchen the military governor of Huaixi Circuit (淮西, headquartered in modern Zhumadian, Henan) attacked Tian from the south. Initially, these joint forces were successful in their attacks against Tian, seizing Ci Prefecture (磁州, in modern Handan) from Tian, but Tian was subsequently able to persuade Li Zhengji to break off his attack, substantially weakening the joint forces. Meanwhile, Li Baochen was offended when an imperial eunuch, Ma Chengqian (馬承倩), who had visited Li Baochen's army, was so dissatisfied with Li Baochen's gift to him that he threw it on the ground, and Tian was also able to use hoaxes to persuade Li Baochen that if he joined forces with Tian to attack Lulong, he would be successful. Li Baochen thus turned against Zhu Tao, launching a surprise attack on him, but was unable to kill Zhu Tao, effectively ending any hopes of the campaign against Tian and subsequently creating an enmity between the Chengde and Lulong Circuits. Tian subsequent ceded Cang Prefecture (滄州, in modern Cangzhou, Hebei) to LI Baochen, cementing the reformed alliance and increasing Li Baochen's holdings to seven prefectures. Meanwhile, though, Tian submitted humble letters of submission to Emperor Daizong, offering to visit the Tang capital Chang'an to pay respect to Emperor Daizong. Emperor Daizong agreed, but as soon as Emperor Daizong pardoned Tian, Tian refused to visit Chang'an, and Emperor Daizong did not press the issue. During the campaign, however, Tian also lost Ying Prefecture (瀛洲, in modern Cangzhou as well) to Zhu Tao.

In 776, when Tian Shenyu (田神玉) the military governor of Biansong Circuit (汴宋, headquartered in modern Kaifeng, Henan) died, the Biansong officer Li Lingyao (李靈曜) seized control of Biansong and wanted to become semi-independent as well. When the imperial government subsequently mobilized the circuits around Biansong to attack Li Lingyao, of all of the nearby circuits, Tian Chengsi not only did not attack Li Lingyao, but also allied with Li Lingyao, sending an army commanded by his nephew Tian Yue to aid Li Lingyao. Tian, however, was defeated by two generals loyal to the imperial government, Li Zhongchen and Ma Sui, and Li Lingyao was himself soon captured by another general loyal to the imperial government, Li Mian, and executed. Tian Chengsi subsequently submitted another apology to Emperor Daizong, and Emperor Daizong, feeling that he had no strength to attack Tian again, pardoned him again and did not require him to visit Chang'an.

Meanwhile, while Tian Chengsi had 11 sons, he considered Tian Yue to be more capable than his sons, and therefore designated Tian Yue as his heir and had his sons serve as Tian Yue's assistants. When he died in 779, at his request and the urging of Li Baochen's, Emperor Daizong allowed Tian Yue to inherit his post, as the military governor of Weibo.
