= Zhu Xicai =

Zhu Xicai (Chinese: 朱希彩) (died 772), formally the Prince of Gaomi (高密王), was a general of the Chinese Tang dynasty. He initially served under Li Huaixian, the military governor (jiedushi) of Lulong Circuit (盧龍, headquartered in modern Beijing), which Li Huaixian governed in de facto independence from the imperial government. In 768, he, along with fellow officers Zhu Ci and Zhu Tao (Zhu Ci's brother), killed Li Huaixian and took over control of the circuit. In 772, he was himself killed and replaced by Zhu Ci.

== Background ==
Little is known about Zhu Xicai's background, and it is not known when he was born. According to the Tang dynasty historian Ping Zhimei (平致美), whose Jimen Jiluan (薊門紀亂) is no longer extant but is often cited in other works, he served under Shi Chaoyi, the final emperor of the state of Yan during the An Shi Rebellion against Tang dynasty rule, and, after Shi Chaoyi had become emperor after assassinating his father Shi Siming in 761, the Yan general remaining at the major city of Fanyang (范陽, in modern Beijing) went through major bloody infighting, at the end of which Li Huaixian emerged the victor. Zhu Xicai was then serving under Li, and he remained at Fanyang to continue to serve under Li after the disturbance. After Li submitted to Emperor Daizong of Tang in 763 and turned against Shi Chaoyi (leading to Shi Chaoyi's committing suicide, ending Yan), Zhu continued to serve under Li.

== As jiedushi ==
In 768, Zhu Xicai, along with his fellow officers Zhu Ci and Zhu Tao, who were brothers to each other but not to Zhu Xicai, rose in rebellion, killed Li Huaixian, and slaughtered Li's family. Zhu Xicai claimed the title of acting military governor and slaughtered Li Huaixian's household. When the military governor of neighboring Chengde Circuit (成德, headquartered in modern Shijiazhuang, Hebei), Li Baochen, who had an alliance of Li Huaixian and lamented his death, subsequently attacked Lulong to try to avenge Li Huaixian, Zhu Xicai defeated him. The imperial government decided to placate Zhu Xicai by naming him deputy military governor and naming the chancellor Wang Jin military governor. When Wang subsequently arrived at Lulong, Zhu Xicai formally showed him the utmost respect, but had the soldiers be on high alert and did not allow Wang to take actual reign of the circuit. Wang, knowing that he would be unable to wrest control of the circuit from Zhu Xicai, stayed in Lulong only a few days before returning to the Tang capital Chang'an. Subsequently, Zhu Xicai was made acting military governor and, at the end of 768, military governor.

It was said that after Zhu Xicai was named military governor, he became arrogant and extravagant, and he mistreated his soldiers. He was also resistant to imperial authority, effectively ruling Lulong as an independent realm. In 772, his secretary Li Huaiyuan (李懷瑗), because the soldiers were angry at Zhu Xicai, assassinated him. Zhu Ci, who was then Zhu Xicai's deputy, succeeded him.

== Notes and references ==
- Old Book of Tang, vol. 143.
- New Book of Tang, vol. 212.
- Zizhi Tongjian, vol. 224.
