= Li Baochen =

Chinese Tang dynasty general and former rebel (718-781)

Li Baochen (李寶臣) (718 – February 6, 781), originally named Zhang Zhongzhi (張忠志), courtesy name Weifu (為輔), known as An Zhongzhi (安忠志) during the Anshi Rebellion and Zhang Baochen (張寶臣) 778–779, formally the Prince of Longxi (隴西王), was a general of the Chinese rebel state Yan, who later submitted to and became a general of the Tang dynasty, from which Yan had rebelled. As was in the case of several other Yan generals who submitted to Tang but who had substantial army and territorial holdings, Li was allowed to retain his command and territory, semi-independent of the Tang imperial government structure.

== Background ==
Zhang Zhongzhi was born in 718, during the reign of Emperor Xuanzong of Tang. He was ethnically Xi and from Fanyang Circuit (范陽, headquartered in modern Beijing), but his original lineage was not otherwise known in history. He was adopted by Zhang Suogao (張鎖高), and therefore took Zhang Suogao's surname of Zhang. He was capable in horsemanship and archery in his youth and served in the military at Fanyang as well, eventually serving under the military governor (jiedushi) An Lushan. On an occasion when An visited the Tang dynasty capital Chang'an to pay homage to Emperor Xuanzong, Zhang Zhongzhi followed him to Chang'an and was kept there to be an archer in the imperial guards and given access to the palace.

== During the Anshi Rebellion ==
An Lushan rose against Emperor Xuanzong's rule in late 755, and Zhang Zhongzhi, hearing the news, escaped from Chang'an and joined An in Fanyang. An was impressed and adopted him as a son, giving him the surname of An. Subsequently, when the rebels made a surprise raid against Taiyuan, it was An Zhongzhi who led the attack, and he was able to seize the Tang mayor of Taiyuan, Yang Guanghui (楊光翽). An Lushan subsequently put him in charge of defending the key pass of Tumen (土門, in modern Shijiazhuang, Hebei). After An Lushan's subsequent death and replacement as the emperor of a new Yan state by his son An Qingxu, An Zhongzhi continued to serve under An Qingxu, who made him the prefect of Heng Prefecture (恆州, roughly modern Shijiazhuang). His service of An Qingxu lasted until 757, when Tang forces put An Qingxu under siege in Yecheng. At that time, the major Yan general Shi Siming submitted to Tang, and An Zhongzhi submitted to Tang as well, subsequently serving under Shi. Emperor Xuanzong's son and successor Emperor Suzong created An Zhongzhi the Duke of Miyun and let him remain at his post.

However, Shi did not himself remain under submission to Tang for long, and when he himself rose against Tang and claimed the Yan throne, he made An Zhongzhi a minister and had him defend the region along with Xin Wanbao (辛萬寶). After Shi was assassinated and succeeded by his son Shi Chaoyi in 761, An Zhongzhi refused to serve Shi Chaoyi. He had his officer Wang Wujun kill Xin and then submitted to Tang, allowing Tang forces access to the region through Tumen. Emperor Suzong's son and successor Emperor Daizong accepted his submission, gave him the imperial surname of Li, and further gave him the new personal name of Baochen (meaning "treasured subject"). He, along with fellow Yan generals Xue Song, Tian Chengsi, and Li Huaixian, were allowed to keep their territory, and he was made the military governor of Chengde Circuit (成德, headquartered in modern Shijiazhuang, Hebei), consisting of six prefectures that he controlled. Emperor Daizong also created him the Duke of Zhao.

== After the Anshi Rebellion ==
The four former Yan generals formed alliances among themselves, as well as with two other military governors, Li Zhengji and Liang Chongyi, hoping to be able to pass their territories to their descendants, semi-independent of the Tang imperial government, retaining their armies and taxes without submitting them to the imperial government. As part of this alliance, Li Baochen's brother Li Baozheng (李寶正) married Tian's daughter, and Li Baochen gave a daughter in marriage to Li Zhengji's son Li Na and took a daughter of Li Zhengji's to be the wife of his son Li Weicheng (李惟誠). Li Baochen, however, would for a while be more submissive to the imperial government than others in the alliance, and when Zhu Xicai assassinated Li Huaixian in 768 and took over Lulong Circuit (盧龍, i.e., the circuit formerly known as Fanyang), Li Baochen attacked Zhu Xicai under the name of the Tang imperial regime, but he was repelled by Zhu, and Emperor Daizong subsequently allowed Zhu to retain Lulong Circuit.

Li Baochen's alliance with Tian Chengsi, who controlled Weibo Circuit (魏博, headquartered in modern Handan, Hebei), would be severely tested in 775, as Tian, despite the alliance, looked down at his allies and had seized most of Xue Song's Zhaoyi Circuit (昭義, headquartered in modern Anyang, Henan) after Xue's death in 773 rather than allowing Xue's family to retain the territory. In or shortly before 775, there was an incident where Li Baozheng and Tian's son Tian Wei (田維) were playing polo at Weibo, when an accidental collision between Li Baozheng's and Tian Wei's horses killed Tian Wei. Tian Chengsi, in anger, imprisoned Li Baozheng and sent a messenger to Li Baochen in protest. Li Baochen, wanting to be conciliatory, sent a cane back with Tian's messenger and allowed Tian to discipline Li Baozheng — but Tian, in anger over his son's death, caned Li Baozheng to death, causing Li Baochen to break off the alliance with Tian. He and Li Zhengji, who also felt slighted by Tian, submitted petitions to the imperial government asking to attack Tian, and Emperor Daizong agreed, launching troops from a number of circuits loyal to the imperial government, in addition to Li Baochen's and Li Zhengji's forces, to attack Tian. Li Baochen, Zhu Tao (whose brother Zhu Ci had killed Zhu Xicai in 772, submitted Lulong to Tang imperial authority, and went to Chang'an to serve as chancellor, leaving Zhu Tao in command of Lulong), and Xue Jianxun (薛兼訓) the military governor of Taiyuan Circuit attacked Tian from the north, while Li Zhengji and Li Zhongchen the military governor of Huaixi Circuit (淮西, headquartered in modern Zhumadian, Henan) attacked Tian from the south. Initially, these joint forces were successful in their attacks against Tian, seizing Ci Prefecture (磁州, in modern Handan) from Tian, but Tian was subsequently able to persuade Li Zhengji to break off his attack, substantially weakening the joint forces. Meanwhile, Li Baochen was offended when an imperial eunuch, Ma Chengqian (馬承倩), who had visited Li Baochen's army, was so dissatisfied with Li Baochen's gift to him that he threw it on the ground, and Tian was also able to use hoaxes to persuade Li Baochen that if he joined forces with Tian to attack Lulong, he would be successful. Li Baochen thus turned against Zhu Tao, launching a surprise attack on him, but was unable to kill Zhu Tao, effectively ending any hopes of the campaign against Tian and subsequently creating an enmity between the Chengde and Lulong Circuits. Tian subsequent ceded Cang Prefecture (滄州, in modern Cangzhou, Hebei) to LI Baochen, cementing the reformed alliance and increasing Li Baochen's holdings to seven prefectures. By 777, Li Baochen had an army that was 50,000-men strong, and Emperor Daizong created him the Prince of Longxi.

In 778, for reasons unclear in history, Li Baochen briefly assumed his old surname of Zhang. However, in 779, he became apprehensive about having done so, and, with Emperor Daizong's permission, reassumed the imperial surname of Li. Also in 779, when Tian Chengsi died, it was at the urging of Li Baochen that Emperor Daizong officially approved Tian Chengsi's selected successor, his nephew Tian Yue, as Tian Chengsi's successor.

As Li Baochen grew older, he was planning to pass his territory to his son Li Weiyue, but as Li Weiyue was described to be weak in personality, he feared that Li Weiyue would not be able to control the army. Therefore, he began to systematically kill the stronger military officers in his army to eliminate potential challengers to Li Weiyue. The only officers to escape this fate were Zhang Xiaozhong the prefect of Yi Prefecture (易州, in modern Baoding, Hebei) — who resisted repeated summons by Li Baochen and stayed at Yi Prefecture, although not turning against Li Baochen while Li Baochen was alive — and Wang Wujun, who was close to Li Baochen and whose son Wang Shizhen had married Li Baochen's daughter. It was also said that in his old age, he became particularly superstitious and trusted sorcerers who predicted that he would have long life and supreme power (i.e., become emperor). In 781, the sorcerers made him a potion that was supposed to yield long life, but instead was poisonous, and he died within three days of drinking it. Li Weiyue would succeed him without Tang imperial approval, and by 782 was killed by Wang, ending the Li family's hold on Chengde.

== Family ==
=== Children ===
- Li Weicheng, eldest son of Li Baochen. regional inspector (cishi) of Pu Prefecture
- Li Weiyue, second son of Li Baochen
- Li Weijian (李惟简), third son of Li Baochen, governor (jiedushi) of Fengxiang

== Notes and references ==
- Old Book of Tang, vol. 142.
- New Book of Tang, vol. 211.
- Zizhi Tongjian, vols. 217, 219, 220, 222, 223, 224, 225, 226.
