= Li Zhengji =

General in Tang dynasty China, of Korean descent (733-781)

Chinese name
- Traditional Chinese: 李正己
- Simplified Chinese: 李正己
Transcriptions
Standard Mandarin
- Hanyu Pinyin: Li Zhengji

Korean name
- Hangul: 이정기
- Hanja: 李正己
Transcriptions
- Revised Romanization: I Jeonggi
- McCune–Reischauer: I Chŏnggi

Li Zhengji, also rendered as Yi Chŏnggi (733 – 28 August 781), né Li Huaiyu (李懷玉), was a Chinese military general and politician of the Tang dynasty, originally of Goguryeo descent.

== Background ==
Li Zhengji was born Li Huaiyu in 733, during the reign of Emperor Xuanzong of Tang. He was born in Tang's Pinglu Circuit (平盧, then headquartered in modern Chaoyang, Liaoning). As of 758, he served in the military at Pinglu Circuit's capital prefecture, Ying Prefecture (營州), along with his cousin Hou Xiyi (侯希逸).

In 758, when the military governor (jiedushi) Wang Xuanzhi (王玄志) died in the midst of the Anshi Rebellion, Emperor Xuanzong's son and successor Emperor Suzong sent an emissary to Pinglu, preparing to find a successor to Wang in the Pinglu army. However, Li Huaiyu believed that Wang's son would be made military governor and did not want that to happen, so he killed Wang's son and supported Hou to succeed Wang. In response, Emperor Suzong initially made Hou deputy military governor and then eventually military governor. (This action was much criticized by the Song dynasty historian Sima Guang in his Zizhi Tongjian, and Sima believed this to mark the beginning of the failing of Tang military discipline.)

== Service under Hou Xiyi ==
By 762, however, Pinglu, which was cut off from Tang territory by the rebel Yan state and facing repeated attacks from Khitan and Xi tribes, was in a desperate situation. Hou Xiyi thus took the Pinglu army and attacked the Yan general Li Huaixian at Fanyang, and then, after battling with Li Huaixian, took his army south to the Shandong Peninsula, subsequently assisting other Tang generals Tian Shen'gong (田神功) and Neng Yuanhao (能元皓) in attacking Yan generals in the east. In 762, after Emperor Suzong's death, Emperor Suzong's son successor Emperor Daizong made Hou also the military governor of Ziqing Circuit (淄青, headquartered in modern Weifang, Shandong), governing six prefectures. (The Pinglu name thus eventually displaced the Ziqing name as the official designation of the circuit.) Subsequently, Hou led his Pinglu army in continued campaigns against the final Yan emperor Shi Chaoyi and participated in the campaign ending in Shi's destruction in 763. Li Huaiyu followed Hou in these campaigns and served with distinction, and Hou made him bingmashi (兵馬使), serving as Hou's assistant.

Meanwhile, though, Hou began to lose the support of his soldiers, because he favored hunting and games, as well as building Buddhist towers and temples, because these activities drained the circuit treasury and forced the soldiers into difficult labor. Meanwhile, he saw that Li Huaiyu was gaining the support of the soldiers and became apprehensive, and he relieved Li Huaiyu from his post even though Li Huaiyu had not had faults. In summer 765, on an occasion when Hou happened to have spent the night outside the city with sorcerers, the soldiers mutinied and closed the gates, disallowing his return. They supported Li Huaiyu as their new commander. Emperor Daizong made his son Li Miao (李邈) the Prince of Zheng the titular military governor of Pinglu, but made Li Huaiyu the acting military governor and changed his name to Zhengji (meaning, "one who corrects himself"). Li Zhengji, however, governed Pinglu effectively independent of the imperial government, in alliance with several other military governors who were acting similarly — Li Baochen, Tian Chengsi, Xue Song, Li Huaixian (all former Yan generals who submitted to Tang after Shi's fall), and Liang Chongyi. By this point, Pinglu consisted of 10 prefectures.

== As Jiedushi ==
Li Zhengji was soon made military governor. He continued his alliance with the other military governors who sought de facto independence from the imperial government in order to pass the territory to their descendants, however, and as part of the alliance system he gave a daughter in marriage to Li Baochen's son Li Weicheng (李惟誠) and took a daughter of Li Baochen's as the wife of his son Li Na. By 775, however, both Li Zhengji and Li Baochen were displeased with another member of the alliance — Tian Chengsi, who had seized much of Xue Song's Zhaoyi Circuit (昭義, headquartered in modern Anyang, Henan) and merged it into his own Weibo Circuit (魏博, headquartered in modern Handan, Hebei) and who had offended both Li Zhengji and Li Baochen by looking down on him and by caning Li Baochen's brother Li Baozheng (李寶正), a son-in-law, to death. In 775, both Li Zhengji and Li Baochen submitted proposals to Emperor Daizong to attack Tian, and Emperor Daizong approved, mobilizing the armies several other circuits loyal to the imperial government (commanded by Li Zhongchen, Zhu Tao, and Xue Jianxun (薛兼訓)) as well to join Li Zhengji and Li Baochen in attack. The joint army initially were successful against Tian, causing Tian much apprehension, but soon began to fall apart, with Li Zhengji initially withdrawing his army after his army complained that Li Baochen's army was receiving more rewards than they were. Tian further sent messengers to flatter Li Zhengji and hinting that he would be willing to yield his land to Li Zhengji, thus causing Li Zhengji to hold off his attacks entirely. Eventually, after Tian was able to play Li Baochen off against Zhu, Emperor Daizong was forced to abandon the campaign against Tian and, at Li Zhengji's urging, permitted Tian to remain at his post.

In 776, after the death of Tian Shenyu (田神玉, Tian Shen'gong's brother), the acting military governor of Biansong Circuit (汴宋, headquartered in modern Kaifeng, Henan), Tian Shenyu's subordinate Li Lingyao (李靈曜) seized control of Biansong Circuit and tried to act independently as well. This time Emperor Daizong reacted by ordering Li Zhengji, Li Zhongchen, Li Mian, Ma Sui, and Chen Shaoyou (陳少遊) to attack Li Lingyao. The main attack against Biansong's capital prefecture Bian Prefecture (汴州) was commanded by Li Zhongchen and Ma, but the other military governors also attacked Biansong from other sides, and, as part of the campaign, Li Zhengji seized five of the eight Biansong prefectures and requested that they be merged into Pinglu. Emperor Daizong agreed, and Li Zhengji moved his headquarters from Qing Prefecture (青州) to Yun Prefecture (鄆州, in modern Tai'an, Shandong), leaving Qing Prefecture in Li Na's hands. Also at his request, Emperor Daizong incorporated Li Zhengji's line into the imperial clan rolls. It was said that by this point, Li Zhengji became the most powerful military governor, with 100,000 men in his army. He governed Pinglu with a harsh hand, such that the citizens in Pinglu did not dare to converse with each other publicly, but it was also said that his laws were fair and simple and the tax burden was low. The military governors of the nearby circuits were all fearful of him. Emperor Daizong created him the Prince of Raoyang.

In 779, after Emperor Daizong's death and succession by his son Emperor Dezong, who had a reputation of being capable and wanting to suppress the power of the military governors, Li Zhengji, wanting to flatter the young emperor, offered to submit a large amount of cash as tribute. Emperor Dezong, listening to the advice of his chancellor Cui Youfu, sent imperial messengers to Pinglu to accept the tribute from Li Zhengji and immediately distribute the tribute to the Pinglu soldiers. Li Zhengji was said to be impressed by but became even more apprehensive of the new emperor as a result. After Emperor Dezong put down a rebellion led by Liu Wenxi (劉文喜) in 780 and showed Liu's severed head to Li Zhengji's messengers, Li Zhengji became even more fearful and planned for war against the imperial troops.

In spring 781, Li Baochen died, and Emperor Dezong rejected the request by Li Baochen's son Li Weiyue to succeed his father as the military governor of Chengde Circuit (成德, headquartered in modern Shijiazhuang, Hebei). As per the alliance agreement, Li Zhengji and Tian Chengsi's nephew Tian Yue, who had succeeded Tian Chengsi in 779 with imperial approval, prepared for war against the imperial troops, using as an excuse that the chancellor Liu Yan had recently been killed due to false accusations by fellow chancellor Yang Yan. As part of his preparation, Li Zhengji unsuccessfully tried to stop the food shipments from the Yangtze River region, through the Grand Canal, to the Tang capital Chang'an, as the imperial general Zhang Wanfu (張萬福) was able to escort the food shipments through despite intimidation by Pinglu troops.

Li Zhengji died in summer or fall 781. His son, Li Na, as was the case with Li Weiyue, was refused imperial approval to succeed him, but eventually the Emperor Dezong was forced to agree to his succession.

== Family ==
- Li Na, son
- Li Shigu, grandson
- Li Shidao, grandson

Government offices
Preceded by None	Governor of Qi; 756–781	Succeeded by Li Na
