= Liang Chongyi =

Chinese general

Liang Chongyi (梁崇義) (died 781) was a general of the Chinese dynasty Tang dynasty. During the reign of Emperor Daizong, Liang took advantage of the army's discontent after the death of the general Lai Tian (來瑱) to seize control of Shannan East Circuit (山南東道, headquartered in modern Xiangfan, Hubei) and held it semi-independently from the imperial regime. After Emperor Daizong's son Emperor Dezong became emperor, however, he was defeated by another general then-loyal to the imperial government, Li Xilie, and committed suicide as his headquarters were falling.

== Background ==
It is not known when Liang Chongyi was born, but it is known that his family was from the Tang capital Chang'an. He became known for his strength and was said to be able to fold gold and straighten out metal hooks. He became an archer in the imperial guards and later served under the general Lai Tian in Tang's struggle against rebel Yan forces during the Anshi Rebellion. He was said to be silent and liked by other soldiers, and eventually became an officer. He continued to follow Lai late in the Anshi Rebellion as Lai became the military governor (jiedushi) of Shannan East Circuit. During this time, Lai became hesitant to periodically visit Chang'an to pay respect to Emperor Suzong, because of his poor relationships with the powerful eunuchs, led by Li Fuguo.

After Emperor Suzong's death in 762, Emperor Suzong's son and successor Emperor Daizong, then under heavy influence by Li Fuguo (as Li Fuguo held the command of the imperial guards and therefore controlled the capital), tried to remove Lai from his power base by moving him to Huaixi Circuit (淮西, headquartered in modern Zhumadian, Henan). Lai, however, was fearful of the move, and both he and his army favored staying in Shannan East, and so declined the move to Huaixi. Emperor Daizong relented and kept him at Shannan East. After Li Fuguo was removed from power later in the year, however, Lai accepted honorary titles as the minister of defense and chancellor and reported to Chang'an to meet Emperor Daizong. Once he got to Chang'an, however, his old enmity with the new eunuch in charge of the imperial guards, Cheng Yuanzhen, flared up, and Cheng induced another official, Wang Zhongsheng (王仲升), into accusing Lai being complicit with Yan generals during the Anshi Rebellion. Lai was removed from his posts and exiled, but was further ordered to commit suicide on the way to exile.

Prior to Lai's visiting Chang'an, however, he had left several key officers stationed at various prefectures of Shannan East. When they heard of Lai's death, they, including Liang, who was then at Nanyang (南陽, in modern Nanyang, Henan), fled their posts back to Xiang Prefecture (襄州), the capital prefecture for Shannan East. Neither he nor two other officers, Li Zhao (李昭) and Xue Nanyang (薛南陽), was initially willing to claim leadership, but the soldiers supported him, and so he took command. He soon executed Li and Xue and blamed the disturbance on them. Emperor Daizong was unable to do anything against Liang at that point, so he made Liang the reserve military governor, and shortly after military governor, of Shannan East. Liang took Lai's body and reburied it with honor, and further built a temple dedicated to Lai. He went as far as to avoid using Lai's old office and main hall, to show respect.

== As Jiedushi ==
Liang Chongyi soon began to govern the circuit as a semi-independent realm from imperial authority, and he was allied with several other generals in the same position -- Xue Song, Tian Chengsi, Li Baochen, Li Zhengji, and Li Huaixian. The imperial government was unable to do anything about them and was content with nominal submission from them. Overall, he controlled six prefectures. However, as, unlike his allies, he was completely surrounded by circuits loyal to the imperial government, and also had the weakest army among the six, he tended to be the most respectful to the imperial government and occasionally followed imperial decrees. Nevertheless, after Emperor Daizong's death in 779, when his relatives advised him that he should visit Chang'an to pay respect to the new emperor, Emperor Daizong's son Emperor Dezong, Liang stated:

Lord Lai had great achievement for the state. During the Shangyuan era [(760-762, i.e., during Emperor Suzong's reign)], he was falsely accused by evil eunuchs, and therefore hesitated at paying respect to the emperor. As soon as Emperor Daizong took the throne, he went to visit the emperor without being summoned, but could not avoid having his family slaughtered. How can I, who have accumulated this much guilt, do so?

== Death ==
As of 781, however, things came to a head when two of the generals that Liang was allied with, Li Baochen and Li Zhengji, died, and Emperor Dezong refused to allow their sons (Li Weiyue and Li Na), respectively, to succeed as military governors of their circuits (Chengde (成德, headquartered in modern Shijiazhuang, Hebei) and Pinglu (平盧, headquartered in modern Tai'an, Shandong)). Li Weiyue and Li Na, along with Tian Chengsi's successor Tian Yue, therefore prepared for war against the imperial government, as did Liang Chongyi, particularly since Li Xilie, the military governor of Huaixi, had repeatedly requested imperial approval to attack Liang. When a certain Guo Xi (郭昔) accused Liang of treason, however, Emperor Dezong, in order to placate Liang, had Guo caned and exiled, and then sent the official Li Zhou (李舟) to Xiang Prefecture to try to comfort Liang. Li Zhou's mission, however, had the opposite effect, as Li Zhou's prior mission to another rebellious general, Liu Wenxi (劉文喜), was followed by Liu's soldiers rising against him and killing him, and it was rumored that Li Zhou had an ability to turn rebellious generals' subordinates against them. Therefore, as Li Zhou reached the borders of Shannan East, Liang refused him entry and requested another imperial messenger. Because Emperor Dezong was then preparing for war against Chengde and Pinglu, he did not want another war with Shannan East at the moment. He therefore sent another official, Zhang Zhuo (張著), to Shannan East, honoring Liang with the honorary title as chancellor, creating his wife as a lady, bestowing on him an iron certificate (guaranteeing that he would not be put to death), and summoning him to Chang'an. He also accepted Liang's prior recommendation that one of the officers he favored, Lin Gao (藺杲), be made the prefect of Deng Prefecture (鄧州, in modern Nanyang). After Zhang arrived at Xiang Prefecture, Liang hesitated about what to do, as did Lin, who did not dare to accept the post without Liang's approval. Liang, after some thought, wept in Zhang's presence but still refused to visit Chang'an.

In reaction, Emperor Dezong created Li Xilie the Prince of Nanping and put in him charge of the operations against Liang. Meanwhile, Liang launched a preemptive attack against Jiangling, hoping to capture it and gain access to the south. However, he was defeated at Siwang (四望, in modern Xiangfan) and retreated back to Xiang Prefecture. He gathered his troops and concentrated them in Xiang and Deng Prefectures, while Li Xilie gathered the forces and headed northwest on the Han River toward Xiang Prefecture. Liang attacked some of Li Xilie's troops stationed at Linhan (臨漢, near Xiang Prefecture), slaughtering them, but subsequently, when Li Xilie's main troops arrived, Liang's generals Zhai Hui (翟暉) and Du Shaocheng (杜少誠) were defeated by Li Xilie at Man River (蠻水, flowing through modern Xiangfan) and then Shukou (疎口, also in modern Xiangfan). Zhai and Du surrendered to Li Xilie, and Li Xilie ordered them to take their troops to enter Xiangyang (the capital of Xiang Prefecture) first. Liang ordered resistance, but his troops opened the gates and fled outside. Liang, seeing no escape, committed suicide with his wife and children by jumping into a well. Li Xilie took his body out from the well, cut off the head, and sent it to Chang'an. Li Xilie also slaughtered Liang's relatives and friends, as well as 3,000 soldiers who had participated in the Battle of Linhan.

== Notes and references ==
- Old Book of Tang, vol. 121.
- New Book of Tang, vol. 224, part 1.
- Zizhi Tongjian, vols. 222, 223, 225, 226, 227.
