= Weibo (Tang dynasty) =

Province during the Chinese Tang Dynasty

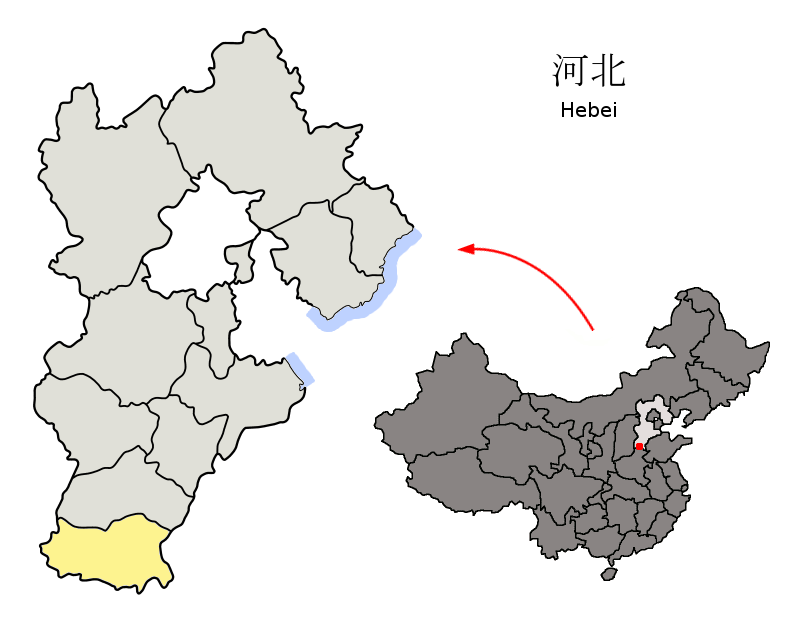
Location of Handan Prefecture within Hebei province

Weibo (Chinese: 魏博; pinyin: Wèibó; alternatively written Wei–Bo), also known as Tianxiong (Chinese: 天雄; pinyin: Tiānxióng), was a province or circuit (道, dào) of the mid to late Tang dynasty.

The area was governed from the capital of Weizhou (魏州) in modern Daming County, Handan, Hebei, and controlled the southern Hebei and northern Shandong regions.

In the post–An Lushan period, Tang Suzong combined Weizhou and Bozhou (博州) under the command of the Weibo Army, and Tian Chengsi became the first jiedushi or military governor of Weibo. The Weibo region, ruled autonomously by the Tian family, subsequently became one of the revolting garrisons of Hebei.

Weibo features prominently in the film The Assassin (2015 film).

== History ==
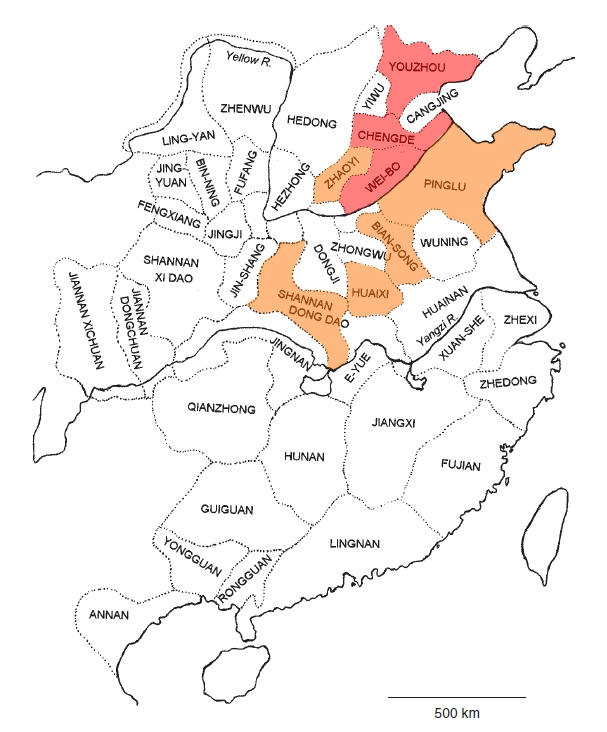
Rebellious provinces in the post-An Lushan Tang dynasty. Red provinces were lost to the Tang forever while the orange provinces were reincorporated.

=== Tian Chengsi (r. 763–779) ===
Tian Chengsi was originally from Lulong (Hebei). He was a general under An Lushan that surrendered to the Tang twice. Post-rebellion, he took control of Weibo in 763 and rebelled against the court twice.

=== Tian Yue (r. 779–784) ===
Tian Yue was the nephew of Tian Chengsi. He succeeded Chengsi as commander of Weibo in 779. In 781, he joined Li Weiyue of Chengde against the Tang court and declared himself Prince of Wei in 782. He was killed by his cousin, Tian Xu.

=== Tian Xu (r. 784–796) ===
Tian Xu was the son of Tian Chengsi. He killed his cousin, Tian Yue, in a coup in 784. He was confirmed jiedushi of Weibo by the Tang court and married Emperor Daizong of Tang's daughter, the Princess of Jiacheng.

=== Tian Ji'an (r. 796–812) ===
Tian Ji'an was the son of Tian Xu by a concubine. He was adopted by the Princess of Jiacheng when she married his father in 785 since she had no child of her own. It was said that Ji'an was cruel and ferocious. Tian Hongzheng, a nephew of Tian Chengsi, urged Ji'an to stop his wanton cruelty. This gained the ire of Ji'an who sought to kill Hongzheng. When Ji'an died in 812, his son Tian Huaijian succeeded him.

=== Tian Huaijian (r. 812) ===
Tian Huaijian was the son of Ji'an and succeeded his father at the age of 10 in 812. Due to his youth, the servant Jiang Shize made all the important decisions. This caused the soldiers to become angry and they went to Tian Hongzheng, requesting him to take over. Hongzheng agreed, executed Jiang, and moved Huaijian out of the headquarters.

=== Tian Hongzheng (r. 812–820) ===
Tian Hongzheng was a nephew of Tian Chengsi and succeeded the 10-year old Tian Huaijian in 812. He submitted to imperial authority and aided the Tang in fighting Wu Yuanji of Huaixi (Zhumadian) and Li Shidao of Pinglu (Tai'an). In 820 he was transferred to Chengde (Shijiazhuang) and was killed by Wang Tingcou.

=== Li Su (r. 820-821) ===
Li Su, the Tang general that had defeated Wu Yuanji of Huaixi, was transferred to Weibo, but grew ill soon after and died.

=== Tian Bu (r. 821-822) ===
Tian Bu, a son of Tian Hongzheng, took over command and tried to avenge his father by attacking Chengde. His troops mutinied and forced him to commit suicide.

=== Shi Xiancheng (r. 822–829) ===
Shi Xiancheng, a man of Kumo Xi stock who had served in the army of Weibo, became the new commander with the support of Weibo's soldiers. In 827, the Tang court tried to enlist his help against Li Tongjie. He joined Li instead. After Li's defeat, Shi was killed by rebellious troops.

=== He Jintao (r. 829–840) ===
He Jintao was chosen leader of Weibo by the soldiers who had rebelled against Shi Xiancheng. It was said that he was favored by the people. He died in 840 and his son succeeded him.

=== He Hongjing (r. 840–865) ===
He Hongjing succeeded his father, Jintao, in 840. In 843, Hongjing was tasked by the Tang court with attacking Zhaoyi (Changzhi). Although reluctant, Emperor Wuzong of Tang forced Hongjing to contribute by threatening to send troops through Weibo if he did not obey. He died in 865 and was succeeded by his son.

=== He Quanhao (r. 865-870) ===
He Quanhao succeeded his father, Hongjing, in 865. He contributed troops to the suppression of Pang Xun in 868. It was said that Quanhao was cruel. His soldiers mutinied in 870 and killed him.

=== Han Junxiong (r. 871–874) ===
Han Junxiong was a soldier in the Weibo army. After He Quanhao was killed by his soldiers in 870, Junxiong was selected as their commander. In 871, the Tang court acknowledged him as Weibo's commander. He died in 874 and his son succeeded him.

=== Han Jian (r.874–883) ===
Han Jian succeeded his father in 874 and was acknowledged by the Tang court in 875. When Wang Xianzhi and Huang Chao's rebellions started ravaging the Tang dynasty in the mid-870s, Han Jian expanded his territory by attacking and pillaging Heyang Circuit (河陽, headquartered in modern Jiaozuo, Henan) in 882. He then tried to take Yunzhou (鄆州, in modern Tai'an, Shandong), the capital of Tianping Circuit (天平). After an unsuccessful siege lasting half a year, Heyang had been retaken by its military governor, Zhuge Shuang. Han lifted the siege and attempted to confront Zhuge, but was intercepted and defeated by Zhuge's officer. In 883, one of Han's officers, Le Xingda took over Weibo. It's uncertain how Han Jian died.

== List of jiedushi ==
1. Tian Chengsi (705–779)
2. Tian Yue (751–784)
3. Tian Xu (764–796)
4. Tian Ji'an (781–812)
5. Tian Huaijian (802–812)
6. Tian Hongzheng (764–821)
7. Li Su (773–821)
8. Tian Bu (785–822)
9. Shi Xiancheng (?–829)
10. Li Ting (829)
11. He Jintao (?-840)
12. Li Wan (840; in absentia)
13. He Hongjing (806–865)
14. He Quanhao (839–870)
15. Li Yan (870–871)
16. Han Junxiong (814–874)
17. Han Jian (?-883)
18. Le Yanzhen (883–888)
19. Luo Hongxin (888–898)
20. Luo Shaowei (898–910)
21. Luo Zhouhan (910–912)
22. Yang Shihou (912–915)

== Bibliography ==
- Nienhauser, William H (2010), Tang Dynasty Tales: A Guided Reader
- Xiong, Victor Cunrui (2009), Historical Dictionary of Medieval China, United States of America: Scarecrow Press, Inc., ISBN 978-0810860537
