= Li Jifu =

Li Jifu (李吉甫) (758 – November 18, 814), courtesy name Hongxian (弘憲), formally Duke Zhongyi of Zhao (趙忠懿公), was a Chinese cartographer, historian, and politician during the Tang dynasty, serving as a chancellor during the reign of Emperor Xianzong.

== Background ==
Li Jifu was born in 758, during the reign of Emperor Suzong. His family claimed ancestry from Li Mu, a prominent general of the Warring States period state Zhao, and traced its ancestry through a line of officials of Qin dynasty, Han dynasty, Cao Wei, Jin dynasty (266–420), Northern Wei, and Sui dynasty. His grandfather Li Zai (李載) was not recorded to have carried any official titles, but his father Li Qiyun (李栖筠) was a prominent official during the reign of Emperor Suzong's son Emperor Daizong and served as chief imperial censor, carrying the title of Duke of Zanhuang. Li Jifu himself was said to be studious in his youth and capable in writing.

== During Emperor Dezong's reign ==
In 784, during the reign of Emperor Daizong's son Emperor Dezong, when Li Jifu was 26, Li Jifu became a Taichang Boshi (太常博士), a consultant at the ministry of worship (太常寺, Taichang Si), and became known for his knowledge, especially the past Tang tradition, and was often praised for it. In 786, when Emperor Dezong's wife Empress Wang died, the regulation on the proper rituals were missing – as there had not been an empress who was mourned since the times of Emperor Suzong's father Emperor Xuanzong. Li Jifu planned the mourning ceremonies for Empress Wang, and was much praised by Emperor Dezong.

Later, in addition to his Taichang Boshi title, Li Jifu was also made Tuntian Yuanwailang (屯田員外郎), a low-level official at the ministry of public works (工部, Gongbu); he later became Jiabu Yuanwailang (駕部員外郎), a low-level official at the ministry of rite (禮部, Lǐbu). He was respected and treated well by the chancellors Li Mi and Dou Can, but after Lu Zhi became chancellor, he suspected Li Jifu of engaging in partisanship and had him demoted to serve as the secretary general of Ming Prefecture (明州, in modern Ningbo, Zhejiang); later, after a general pardon had been issued, Li Jifu was promoted to be the prefect of Zhong Prefecture (忠州, in modern Chongqing). When Lu was himself exiled, it was said that Lu's rival chancellors wanted to harm him, and then intentionally had him demoted to be the secretary general of Zhong Prefecture – i.e., to serve as Li Jifu's subordinate. Lu's family and friends were concerned deeply, but Li Jifu showed respect to Lu as if Lu were still a chancellor and caused him no harm. The two eventually became friends. Li Jifu served as Zhong Prefecture for six years without further movement, and was later removed on account of illness. He later served as the prefect of either Liu Prefecture (柳州, in modern Liuzhou, Guangxi) or Chen Prefecture (郴州, in modern Chenzhou, Hunan), before serving as the prefect of Rao Prefecture (饒州, in modern Shangrao, Jiangxi). Previously, after four successive prefects had died, the fort that served as headquarters of Rao Prefectures had been abandoned as there were rumors that it was cursed. When Li Jifu arrived, he removed the thorns that had grown up around the fort and moved in with no ill consequences, and the people were comforted.

== During Emperor Xianzong's reign ==
=== Prior to chancellorships ===
After Emperor Dezong's grandson Emperor Xianzong became emperor in 805, Li Jifu was recalled to serve as Kaogong Langzhong (考功郎中), a supervisorial official at the ministry of civil service affairs (吏部, Lìbu, note different tone than the ministry of rites) and put in charge of drafting edicts. Shortly after he arrived at the capital Chang'an, he was made Hanlin Xueshi (翰林學士), an imperial scholar, and soon was further made Zhongshu Sheren (中書舍人), a mid-level official at the legislative bureau of government (中書省, Zhongshu Sheng). During that time, he made several suggestions that caused him to gain further approval by Emperor Xianzong:

- Early in Emperor Xianzong's reign, a long-time minor official at the legislative bureau, Hua Huan (滑渙), who was a close associate to the eunuch general Liu Guangqi (劉光琦), had much power due to his association with Liu, and Li suggested Hua's removal – which Emperor Xianzong carried out in 806.
- When the Li Qi the military governor (Jiedushi) of Zhenhai Circuit (鎮海, headquartered in modern Zhenjiang, Jiangsu) requested to also be the director of the salt and iron monopoly, Li Jifu pointed out that Li Qi was ambitious and rebellious and that giving him the economic benefits of running the monopolies would further strengthen him in case of a rebellion, and thus opposed the request. Emperor Xianzong agreed with Li Jifu.
- When the warlord Liu Pi, who controlled Xichuan Circuit (西川, headquartered in modern Chengdu, Sichuan), resisted Emperor Xianzong's rule, Li Jifu advised military action against Liu Pi, and further suggested diverting Liu's attention by directing southern troops through the Three Gorges while the main forces under Gao Chongwen were heading over the mountains.
- When, even before the campaign ultimately succeeded, another general who fought Liu Pi along with Gao, Yan Li (嚴礪), requested that a senior official be put in charge of Xichuan, Li Jifu pointed out that such a move would damage Gao's morale, and under Li Jifu's suggestion, Emperor Xianzong eventually made Gao the military governor of Xichuan while carving out six prefectures from Xichuan, transferring them to its neighbor Dongchuan Circuit (東川, headquartered in modern Mianyang, Sichuan), and making Yan the military governor of Dongchuan.
- When Tufan sought a formal treaty of friendship, Li Jifu pointed out that at the time Tang was allied with Nanzhao against Tufan – and that such a treaty would cause Nanzhao to suspect Tang's good faith and damage the relationship with Nanzhao. When Tufan further offered to return a number of towns that it had captured from Tang previously, Li Jifu pointed out that at that time, Tang had insufficient troops to defend them. Emperor Xianzong thus declined Tufan's proposal.

=== First chancellorship ===
In 807, when Du Huangchang was removed from his chancellor position, Li Jifu was made Zhongshu Shilang (中書侍郎), the deputy head of the legislative bureau, and made de facto chancellor with the title Tong Zhongshu Menxia Pingzhangshi (同中書門下平章事), along with Wu Yuanheng. It was said that he was greatly touched and stated to his subordinate Pei Ji:

I, Li Jifu, was left out in the wild in the Yangtze River-Huai River region for 15 years, and now that I have received such great imperial grace, I need to repay it. The only way to do so is to recommend talented people to serve as officials. I do not know the young officials well. You, sir, are good at judging people; please find them for me.

Pei wrote out a list of over 30 people, and within a month, Li Jifu had them put into appropriate positions. It was believed at the time that Li Jifu was a good judge of character. As he believed that the military governors at the time had too much power over their domains, he advocated granting the prefects under them greater power. However, it was also said that Li Jifu, around that time, falsely accused fellow chancellor Zheng Yin of leaking secrets to the warlord Lu Congshi (盧從史), the military governor of Zhaoyi Circuit (昭義, headquartered in modern Changzhi, Shanxi), and that Emperor Xianzong did not act against Zheng only after the accusation was shown to be unreasonable by the imperial scholar Li Jiang.

Late in 807, Li Jifu submitted a 10-volume work titled the Records of Yuanhe Imperial Accounts (Yuanhe (元和) being Emperor Xianzong's era name) that contained detail accounts of the state of the various circuits of the empire, including the population and revenues.

In 808, at a special imperial examinations where Emperor Xianzong ordered that low-level officials submit honest opinions about the government, several of the examinees – Niu Sengru, Li Zongmin, and Huangfu Shi (皇甫湜) stated, without using any veiled language, the issues they saw with the governance at the time. The officials that Emperor Xianzong put in charge of the examinations, Yang Yuling (楊於陵) and Wei Guanzhi ranked them high. However, Li Jifu saw these as severe criticisms of himself, and, weeping, accused the reviewing officials, the imperial scholars Pei Ji and Wang Ya, of conflict of interest – as Huangfu was a nephew of Wang's. As a result of Li Jifu's accusations, Wang, Pei, Yang, and Wei were all demoted, and it was said that while no harm came to Niu, Li Zongmin, and Huangfu at that time, they were effectively stuck at the positions they previously served without promotion. As a result, they all sought positions as staff members of military governors. (However, Li Jifu's biographies in the Old Book of Tang and New Book of Tang viewed this event as part of the conspiracy by the senior official Pei Jun (裴均) to harm Li Jifu and to have Pei Jun made chancellor.)

Soon thereafter, there was another incident in which Li Jifu and the official Dou Qun (竇群) came into conflict. Li Jifu had previously recommended the officials Yang Shi'e (羊士諤) and Lü Wen (呂溫), and because Dou was also friendly with Yang and Lü, he recommended them as well, without first informing Li Jifu. Li Jifu became displeased and refused to act on Dou's recommendations, thus drawing Dou's resentment. When Dou later found out that one Chen Keming (陳克明) – whom Dou believed to be a sorcerer but who could have been a physician – was visiting Li Jifu's household because Li Jifu was ill – he submitted an accusation to Emperor Xianzong that Li Jifu was associating with sorcerers. When Emperor Xianzong investigated and found no proof of Li Jifu's guilt, Dou and his associates were exiled, but Li Jifu felt insecure and offered to resign, recommending Pei Ji to succeed him. Emperor Xianzong agreed, and, in late 808, made Pei Ji chancellor and made Li Jifu the military governor of Huainan Circuit (淮南, headquartered in modern Yangzhou, Jiangsu), and granted him various medical ingredients from the imperial pharmacy.

=== Between the chancellorships ===
While Li Jifu was at Huainan, it was said that he built Pingjin Dam (平津堰) and two ponds named Furen (富人) and Guben (固本), for irrigation purposes. When the Yangtze-Huai region suffered a great drought, particularly hurting Li Jifu's neighboring circuits Zhexi (浙西, headquartered in modern Zhenjiang) and Zhedong (浙東, headquartered in modern Shaoxing, Zhejiang), the central government agencies in charge did not act, and it was only after an extensive report by Li Jifu that Emperor Xianzong ordered disaster relief. It was also said that Li Jifu often sent suggestions about important matters of state to Emperor Xianzong.

In late 810, Pei Ji was removed from his chancellor position on account of illness, and in spring 811, Li Jifu was recalled to again serve as Zhongshu Shilang and chancellor. He was also given the additional titles of Jinzi Guanglu Daifu (金紫光祿大夫), Shang Zhuguo (上柱國), and imperial scholar of Jixian Palace. He was also put in charge of editing the imperial history and created the Duke of Zhao.

=== Second chancellorship ===
It was said that the people of the time looked forward to Li Jifu's return to chancellorship with great expectations. However, it was also said that soon after his return to chancellorship, fellow chancellor Li Fan was removed, and Pei Ji was further demoted, due to his machinations. Further, it was also said that he began to try to hide his acts from Emperor Xianzong. However, he was credited with advocating a major streamlining of government that saved expenses.

In 811, also at Li Jifu's recommendation – as Li Jifu pointed out that the imperial princes, due to various restrictions, were having difficulty finding appropriate husbands for their daughters and getting the marriages approved – Emperor Xianzong created many princes' daughters ladies and ordered the government agencies to find appropriate gentlemen for them to marry. However, by this point, Emperor Xianzong had heard that Li Jifu was using his office for personal vengeance, and so decided to make Li Jiang a chancellor as well to create a power balance. Thereafter, Li Jifu and Li Jiang often had disputes, causing a rift between the two. In 812, when the chancellors met with Emperor Xianzong, Li Jifu made a comment that the realm was becoming peaceful and that Emperor Xianzong should seek out some pleasure – when Li Jiang commented that there was still much warfare and natural disasters to deal with and it was no time to seek pleasure. Emperor Xianzong approved of Li Jiang's remarks. Li Jifu further became distressed when Emperor Xianzong criticized another chancellor, Yu Di, for proposing harsh punishments – as Li Jifu had just himself proposed the same kind of harsher punishments. On another occasion, however, when Emperor Xianzong met the chancellors, he commented to Li Jifu that he had just read in the imperial archives about the faithfulness of Li Jifu's father Li Qiyun and was impressed – causing Li Jifu to be touched, and he wept and thanked Emperor Xianzong.

Later in 812, when the warlord Tian Ji'an, the military governor of Weibo Circuit (魏博, headquartered in modern Handan, Hebei), died, Li Jifu advocated preparing for a campaign to retake Weibo by force, but Li Jiang advocated another strategy – simply refusing to commission Tian Ji'an's son Tian Huaijian as his successor and waiting for someone else to rise against Tian Huaijian from within Weibo itself. Emperor Xianzong agreed with Li Jiang, and eventually, when Tian Ji'an's relative Tian Xing rose against Tian Huaijian, Emperor Xianzong commissioned Tian Xing as the new military governor as per Li Jiang's argument, overruling Li Jifu's argument that Tian Xing needed to be observed first; Weibo then began to follow imperial orders.

In 813, when Uyghur forces approached Tang borders and announced that they were going through Tang territory to attack Tufan, the border people were alarmed, believing that the Uyghur might be intending to attack them instead. Li Jifu advocated not becoming overly alarmed, but simply repairing 11 border posts to watch them. In 814, he further advocated the reestablishment of You Prefecture (宥州, in modern Yulin, Shaanxi), a special prefecture to settle the surrendered non-Han tribes. Emperor Xianzong approved his proposals.

In 814, when the warlord Wu Shaoyang the military governor of Zhangyi Circuit (彰義, headquartered in modern Zhumadian, Henan), died, Li Jifu advocated preparing for military action to retake Zhangyi by force, rather than allowing Wu Shaoyang's son Wu Yuanji to succeed Wu Shaoyang – pointing out that, by contrast to the warlords north of the Yellow River, Zhangyi was surrounded by circuits loyal to the imperial government. By Li JIfu's recommendation, the headquarters of Zhangyi's neighbor Heyang Circuit (河陽, then-headquartered in modern Jiaozuo, Henan), which was under imperial control and which was stationed in order to protect the eastern capital Luoyang from Weibo, was moved to Ru Prefecture (汝州, in modern Pingdingshan, Henan), to prepare for action against Zhangyi. When Wu Shaoyang's subordinate Yang Yuanqing met Li Jifu, Li Jifu persuaded him to report to the imperial government the strengths and weaknesses of the Zhangyi forces, for the imperial government to further prepare for the campaign. While still preparing for the campaign, Li Jifu died. Initially, the officials in charge of awarding posthumous names proposed Jingxian (敬憲, "alert and knowledgeable"). One of the junior officials, Zhang Zhongfang (張仲方) objected, arguing that that was too flattering. Emperor Xianzong was displeased and exiled Zhang, but subsequently changed Li Jifu's posthumous name to Zhongyi ("faithful and benevolent"). His sons Li Dexiu (李德修) and Li Deyu both later served in the imperial government, with Li Deyu becoming a prominent chancellor during the reigns of Emperor Xianzong's grandsons Emperor Wenzong and Emperor Wuzong.

== Written works ==
Li Jifu wrote commentaries on the I Ching. He also compiled a number of historical events from the Eastern Han, Cao Wei, Jin, Northern Zhou, and Sui, commenting on their successes and failures and the reasons, into a 30-volume work known as the Summaries of the Six Dynasties (六代略). In addition to his Records of Yuanhe Imperial Accounts, he also wrote a 54-volume work on the geographical features and histories of the various circuits, including maps, titling the work the Yuanhe Maps of the Commanderies and Principalities (元和郡國圖). He further wrote a one-volume summary of imperial offices' responsibilities entitled the Key Points on Selecting Officials for the Hundred Offices (百司舉要). He submitted these works to the emperor, but the works were also commonly known at the time.

== Notes and references ==
- Old Book of Tang, vol. 148.
- New Book of Tang, vol. 146.
- Zizhi Tongjian, vols. 236, 237, 238, 239.
- Yuanhe Maps of the Counties (元和郡縣圖志), Li, Jifu, and He, Cijun (李吉甫 賀次君). 1983. Zhongguo gudai dili zongzhi congkan (中國古代地理總志叢刊). Beijing: Zhonghua shuju (中華書局 : 新華書店北京發行所發行).
