= He Quanhao =

General of the Chinese Tang Dynasty

He Quanhao (Chinese: 何全皞) (839-870) was a general of the Chinese Tang dynasty, who ruled Weibo Circuit (魏博, headquartered in modern Handan, Hebei) as its military governor (jiedushi) in de facto independence from the imperial government from 866 to 870 as its military governor (jiedushi), although he assisted the imperial government in suppressing Pang Xun's rebellion.

== Background ==
It is not known when He Quanhao was born. His grandfather He Jintao, who had taken over Weibo Circuit after being supported by mutineers who had overthrown and killed the previous military governor Shi Xiancheng, and his father He Hongjing, had successively served as the military governors of Weibo. When He Hongjing died in 866, He Quanhao was serving as one of the military commanders, and the soldiers supported him to succeed He Hongjing. Then-reigning Emperor Yizong approved and made him acting military governor, and then, in 867, full military governor.

== As military governor ==
In 868, when the rebel Pang Xun took over Xu Prefecture (徐州, headquartered in modern Xuzhou, Jiangsu), the imperial government reacted by launching a three-pronged operations against Pang's rebels. The northern wing was initially commanded by the imperial guard general Wang Yanquan (王晏權), but Wang was later replaced by Cao Xiang (曹翔) the military governor of Taining Circuit (泰寧, headquartered in modern Jining, Shandong) in late 868. He Quanhao sent troops, commanded by his officer Xue You (薛尤), to assist Cao. The Weibo troops put the rebel stronghold of Feng County under siege, and repeatedly attacked it. When Pang himself made a surprise attack on the Weibo troops in summer 869, however, Weibo forces collapsed and were forced to withdraw and regroup, allowing the siege on Feng County to be lifted. Still, after Pang's rebellion was suppressed later that year, He Quanhao, for his contributions, was given the honorary titles of acting Sikong (司空, one of the Three Excellencies) and Tong Zhongshu Menxia Pingzhangshi (同中書門下平章事).

It was said that He Quanhao, who was still described as young at that point, was cruel in his punishment, favoring death penalties, and also whipped subordinates severely for even minor offenses. The soldiers thus feared him. In 870, with there being rumors that he would decrease the food and clothing stipends for the soldiers, the soldiers mutinied. He Quanhao tried to flee by himself on horse, but the soldiers tracked him down and killed him. They supported the officer Han Junxiong to replace him, and the imperial government subsequently agreed.

== Notes and references ==
- Old Book of Tang, vol. 181.
- New Book of Tang, vol. 210.
- Zizhi Tongjian, vols. 250, 251, 252.
