= Tian Bu =

Tang Chinese military general

Tian Bu (田布) (785 – February 6, 822), courtesy name Dunli (敦禮), was a Chinese military general of the Chinese Tang dynasty. He was the son of the general Tian Hongzheng, and after Tian Hongzheng's death at the hands of Chengde Circuit (成德, headquartered in modern Shijiazhuang, Hebei) mutineers was put in command of Tian Hongzheng's old command Weibo Circuit (魏博, headquartered in modern Handan, Hebei) to try to avenge Tian Hongzheng. With his own soldiers close to mutiny themselves during the campaign, however, Tian Bu committed suicide.

== Background ==
Tian Bu was born in 785, during the reign of Emperor Dezong. He was the third son of the Weibo Circuit officer Tian Xing, although it is not known whether he was older or younger than his two brothers who were known to history, Tian Qun (田群) and Tian Mou (田牟). When he was young, his father Tian Xing served as the defender of Linqing (臨清, in modern Xingtai, Hebei) under then-military governor (Jiedushi) of Weibo, Tian Ji'an, who was ruling Weibo in a de facto independent manner from the imperial government. It was said that despite Tian Bu's youth, he was able to see that Tian Ji'an's position was not secure and counseled his father to eventually declare loyalty to the imperial government.

== Service under Tian Hongzheng ==
In 812, after Tian Ji'an died, his young son Tian Huaijian initially became nominal ruler of Weibo, without imperial sanction, but soon, the soldiers mutinied and supported Tian Xing as their leader. Tian Xing subsequently submitted to imperial orders and was made the military governor of Weibo and was subsequently renamed Tian Hongzheng by then-ruling Emperor Xianzong. Tian Bu served under his father and commanded the elite troops of Weibo.

In 815, when imperial troops were in the middle of a campaign against the warlord Wu Yuanji, who controlled Zhangyi Circuit (彰義, headquartered in modern Zhumadian, Henan), Tian Hongzheng sent Tian Xing to aid the campaign, commanding 3,000 soldiers. It was said that Tian Bu contributed to victories in 18 battles. In particular, in 817, when the chancellor Pei Du was at the front to oversee the operation, there was an occasion when Pei was reviewing the building of a fort at Tuokou (沱口, in modern Luohe, Henan), when the Zhangyi officer Dong Chongzhi (董重質) made a surprise attack on Pei's location, nearly reaching Pei. It was due to the efforts of Tian Bu and Li Guangyan that Pei was able to flee, and it was said that, after Tian cut off the Zhangyi soldiers' escape route, the Zhangyi soldiers fell into a ditch and suffered more than 1,000 casualties as a result. After the Zhangyi campaign ended in victory later in the year, Tian Bu was made a general of the imperial guards. In 818, when his mother died, he left governmental service to observe a mourning period for her, but was soon recalled to again serve as general of the imperial guards.

== As Jiedushi ==
In 820, Wang Chengzong the military governor of Chengde Circuit, who had previously ruled Chengde in a de facto independent manner but who had offered to submit to imperial orders after Wu Yuanji's defeat, died. The soldiers supported his brother Wang Chengyuan to succeed him, but Wang Chengyuan, not wanting to continue to hold Chengde, declined. In response, then-ruling Emperor Muzong (Emperor Xianzong's son) made a series of military governor transfers for the circuits in the region — transferring Tian Hongzheng from Weibo to Chengde, Wang Chengyuan to Yicheng Circuit (義成, headquartered in modern Anyang, Henan), Li Su from Wuning Circuit (武寧, headquartered in modern Xuzhou, Jiangsu) to Weibo, and Liu Wu from Yicheng to Zhaoyi Circuit (昭義, headquartered in modern Changzhi, Shanxi). He also made Tian Bu the military governor of Heyang Circuit (河陽, headquartered in modern Jiaozuo, Henan). He thus served as military governor at the same time as his father Tian Hongzheng. At that time, the general Han Hong and his son Han Gongwu (韓公武) were also both serving as military governors, but it was said that popular opinion at the time held the Tians in greater esteem than the Hans. In spring 821, Tian Bu was transferred to Jingyuan Circuit (涇原, headquartered in modern Pingliang, Gansu).

However, Emperor Muzong's transfers backfired, to Tian Hongzheng's detriment, as the Chengde soldiers resented him for the previous warfare between Weibo and Chengde. In fall 821, Chengde soldiers led by Wang Tingcou mutinied and killed Tian Hongzheng and his staff members. Li Su, as Tian Hongzheng's successor, mourned Tian Hongzheng and planned to lead the Weibo soldiers in a campaign to avenge Tian Hongzheng, but fell ill and could not do so. Emperor Muzong thus recalled Tian Bu, who was then observing a mourning period for Tian Hongzheng, to serve as the military governor of Weibo. Tian Bu declined several times, but the imperial government insisted. Tian Bu bid farewell to his wife, children, and household guests, stating, "I will not come back!" He reported to Weibo without the customary fanfare with banners and guards, and while he was still some 30 li (roughly 15 kilometers) away from Weibo's capital Wei Prefecture (魏州), he changed into mourning clothes and entered the city in tears. He sold ancestral properties and distributed the proceeds to the soldiers, while turning down his own salary. He also respected the senior officers as if they were his older brothers.

In winter 821, Tian Bu launched his 30,000 troops to attack Wang, capturing two Chengde outposts just south of Nangong (南宮, in modern Xingtai). However, as recounted in a petition from Bai Juyi to Emperor Muzong at the time, he then became bogged down because his soldiers, who had been accustomed to rich rewards from the imperial government, lost their motivation. Meanwhile, as there were heavy snowstorms at the time, the supplies to be shipped by the imperial government's director of finances were not arriving, and Tian ordered that revenues be diverted from the six Weibo prefectures for military use — causing the officers to resent him for stripping the six prefectures of their wealth. The ambitious officer Shi Xiancheng thus used this opportunity to foster dissent in the Weibo ranks. In spring 822, when there was an imperial order for some Weibo soldiers to report to the camp of Li Guangyan the military governor of Zhongwu Circuit (忠武, headquartered in modern Xuchang, Henan) to attack Chengde from the east, the Weibo soldiers largely deserted Tian and fled to Shi's camp. Tian was only able to maintain control over 8,000 soldiers and was forced to return to Wei Prefecture.

Once Tian returned to Wei Prefecture, he again discussed with his senior officers about launching another campaign against Chengde. The officers refused to follow his orders and stated that they would only follow him if he agreed to reassert independence from the imperial government. He saw the hopelessness of the situation he was in, and he wrote a final petition to Emperor Muzong and entrusting it to his staff member Li Shi (who would eventually be chancellor), stating:

I, your subject, see that my people's desire are to turn against the grace of the state. Since your subject did not achieve anything, how can I forget my responsibility to die? I lie prostrate and beg Your Imperial Majesty to do everything possible to rescue Li Guangyan and Niu Yuanyi [(牛元翼, a Chengde officer who had refused to follow Wang and whom Wang was sieging)]. Otherwise, the righteous and the faithful subjects will soon be all slaughtered by the Heshuo [(河朔, i.e., the region north of the Yellow River)] rebels.

Tian then drew his sword and pierced his heart with it. After Shi heard of this news, he returned to Wei Prefecture with the troops, and they supported him to succeed Tian. Emperor Muzong mourned Tian and gave him posthumous honors but allowed Shi to take over Weibo. He also gave Tian Bu the posthumous name of Xiao (孝, "filial"). Later, during the reign of Emperor Muzong's brother Emperor Xuānzong, Tian Bu's son Tian Hui (田鐬), then serving as a prefectural prefect, was accused of corruption and sentenced to death, but the chancellor Cui Xuan pointed out Tian Bu's death for the state and begged for forgiveness for Tian Hui, and so Tian Hui was only demoted.

== Notes and references ==
- Old Book of Tang, vol. 141.
- New Book of Tang, vol. 148.
- Zizhi Tongjian, vols. 239, 240, 241, 242.
