= Liu Zong =

Tang Dynasty general and monk (died 821)

Liú Zǒng (Chinese: 劉總) (died May 2, 821), dharma name Dàjué (大覺), formally Duke of Chǔ (楚公), was a general of the Tang dynasty. He took over control of Lúlóng Circuit (盧龍, headquartered in modern Beijing) in 810 after killing his father Liú Jì (劉濟) as well as his brother Liú Gǔn (劉緄), and thereafter ruled the circuit de facto independently from the imperial government. In 821, he submitted the circuit to imperial control and took tonsure to be a Buddhist monk. He died shortly after.

== Background ==
It is not known when Liu Zong was born. He was the second son of Liu Ji, who ruled Lulong Circuit as its military governor (Jiedushi) starting in 785 (when he succeeded Liu Zong's grandfather Liu Peng). Liu Zong's older brother Liu Gun was considered Liu Ji's heir, and during Liu Ji's rule was made deputy military governor, then considered the post for the heir among warlords who controlled their circuits de facto independently from the imperial government. Liu Zong was made the prefect of Ying Prefecture (瀛州, in modern Cangzhou, Hebei). Liu Zong was described by the Old Book of Tang to be treacherous.

== Killing of father and brother ==
In 810, Liu Ji was commanding his Lulong troops in attacking Wang Chengzong, the ruler of neighboring Chengde Circuit (成德, headquartered in modern Shijiazhuang, Hebei), whom Emperor Xianzong had declared a renegade. He had Liu Gun remain at Lulong's capital You Prefecture (幽州) to serve as acting military governor, while Liu Zong accompanied him on the campaign, serving as the army commander. During the campaign against Wang, Liu Ji had Liu Zong command the siege of Anping (安平, in modern Hengshui, Hebei), and Anping fell in one day. However, the Lulong army became bogged down at Raoyang (饒陽, in modern Hengshui) and was not able to advance further.

Meanwhile, Liu Ji grew ill during the campaign. Liu Zong conspired with Liu Ji's assistant Zhang Qi (張玘), treasurer Cheng Guobao (成國寶), and other officers, to take over power. He had people pretend to be imperial messengers arrive at the Lulong army's camp to state, "As the imperial government sees that you, Lord Chancellor, refuse to advance any further, the Deputy Military Governor has been made military governor." The next day, he had another person state, "The Deputy Military Governor's banner has already arrived at Taiyuan." Later on, he had another person state, "The banner has gone past Dai Prefecture [(代州, in modern Xinzhou, Shanxi)]." The army was shocked by these developments. Liu Ji himself was shocked and incensed, and he killed tens of officers who were friendly with Liu Gun. He also sent messengers to You Prefecture, ordering Liu Gun to report to the Lulong army's camp, while making Zhang Qi's brother Zhang Gao (張皋) take over the headquarters. It was said that due to his anger, Liu Ji did not eat on that day from morning to noon, and when he grew thirsty and asked for a drink, Liu Zong handed him a poisoned drink. On August 20, 810, Liu Ji died from the poison. At Liu Gun travelled from You Prefecture to Zhuo Prefecture (涿州, in modern Baoding, Hebei), Liu Zong issued an order in Liu Ji's name, ordering that Liu Gun be caned to death. Liu Zong then took over the control of the circuit. As the imperial government did not know all that had occurred, Liu Zong was made military governor. He was also created the Duke of Chu.

== As military governor ==
In 816, as Emperor Xianzong waged another campaign against Wang Chengzong, Liu Zong mobilized his troops and captured Chengde's town Wuqiang (武強, in modern Hengshui). He also put Leshou (樂壽, in modern Cangzhou) under siege. In response, Emperor Xianzong gave him the honorary chancellor title of Tong Zhongshu Menxia Pingzhangshi (同中書門下平章事). However, it was said that Liu then effective sat on the fence and did not advance further, and as the regulations at the time were that once a circuit's army advanced out of its borders on an imperially-sanctioned campaign, the imperial treasury would be responsible for its expenses, the Lulong army's supplies were costly to the imperial treasury. With the other armies against Chengde also not making much advances, in 817, Emperor Xianzong abandoned the campaign against Chengde and ordered the circuits' armies to return to their own circuits.

In 817, Wang's ally Wu Yuanji, who ruled Zhangyi Circuit (彰義, headquartered in modern Zhumadian, Henan), was defeated and captured by the imperial general Li Su. In fear, Wang submitted to imperial authority and surrendered two of his six prefectures to imperial control. In the aftermaths of Wang's actions, Liu's officer Tan Zhong (譚忠) persuaded him to also submit to imperial authority.

== Resignation and death ==
Meanwhile, it was said that Liu Zong, after he had killed his father and brother, had often been fearful in his heart, and at times he saw his father and brother in his dreams. He often gave food to several hundred Buddhist monks at his headquarters and had them hold religious ceremonies, and after he finished his day of work he would retreat to a room near the ceremonies. If he did not, then he would not be able to sleep. Seeing that the other circuits had all submitted to imperial authority, in 821 (when Emperor Xianzong's son Emperor Muzong was emperor), he requested to resign and become a Buddhist monk himself. He also requested an award to the soldiers, while ordering a number of officers that he felt were difficult to control, including Zhu Kerong (the grandson of a former military governor, Zhu Tao) to report to Chang'an, hoping that the imperial government would give them proper discipline and rewards such that they would become faithful to the imperial government. He further recommended that Lulong be divided into three circuits and recommended Zhang Hongjing, Xue Ping, and Lu Shimei (盧士玫) to take over the three circuits.

In response to Liu's proposal, Emperor Muzong gave a number of Liu's relatives honored titles, issued a money reward to the Lulong soldiers, and further issued two alternative edicts — one bestowing the dharma name of Dajue on Liu Zong, granting him a temple named Bao'en Temple (報恩寺), and giving him special purple monk robes; and one making him the military governor of Tianping Circuit (天平, headquartered in modern Tai'an, Shandong) and giving him the honorary chancellor title of Shizhong (侍中). He had his eunuchs deliver the two edicts to Liu Zong, to let Liu Zong decide which edict he would accept. However, before the edicts could arrive at You Prefecture, Liu Zong took tonsure and became a monk, and he prepared to depart You Prefecture. Some soldiers refused to let him leave, and he executed some 10 of the leaders and gave his seals to Zhang Qi, making Zhang the acting military governor. He then left in the middle of the night, and only in the morning did the soldiers find out. Zhang submitted a report stating, "I do not know where Liu Zong is by this point." On May 2, Liu Zong, who was by then in Ding Prefecture (定州, in modern Baoding), died.

== Notes and references ==
=== Sources ===
- Old Book of Tang, vol. 143.
- New Book of Tang, vol. 212.
- Zizhi Tongjian, vols. 238, 239, 240, 241.
