= He Jintao =

Chinese general (died 840)

- Traditional Chinese: 何進滔
- Simplified Chinese: 何进滔
Transcriptions
Standard Mandarin
- Hanyu Pinyin: Hé Jìntāo
- Wade–Giles: Ho Chin-t'ao

He Jintao (died 840) was a Chinese general of the Tang Empire. As military governor (jiedushi) of Weibo (魏博) around modern Handan, Hebei, from 829 to 840, he ruled the area in de facto independence from the imperial government.

== Life ==
=== Family background ===
It is not known when He Jintao was born, but it is known that his family was originally from Ling Prefecture (靈州), in modern Yinchuan, Ningxia. His great-grandfather He Xiaowu (何孝物) and grandfather He Jun (何俊) both served as officers in Ling Prefecture. His father He Mo (何默) served as an officer in Xia Prefecture (夏州) around modern Yulin, Shaanxi.

=== Early years ===
Eventually, He Jintao settled in Weibo's capital Weizhou (魏州) and came to serve in its army under the military governor Tian Hongzheng, who was obedient to the imperial government. As Tian served as the military governor of Weibo from 812 to 820, He Jintao's service under him must have been during those years. At one point, Tian waged a campaign against Wang Chengzong, the military governor of Chengde around modern Shijiazhuang, Hebei, for resisting imperial orders. During a night raid against Chengde's capital Hengzhou, Wang responded by sending an officer in an iron mask and commanding 1,000 cavalry soldiers to counterattack against the Weibo forces. He Jintao engaged the Chengde cavalry soldiers and defeated them, almost capturing the officer in the iron mask, causing much apprehension among the Chengde soldiers. For his assistance during a subsequent campaign that Tian conducted against Li Shidao, the military governor of Pinglu (平盧) around modern Tai'an, Shandong, He Jintao was given the honorary imperial censor title of Shiyushi (侍御史).

=== Mutiny ===
By 829, He Jintao was serving under Shi Xiancheng, who was ruling Weibo in de facto independence from the imperial government. However, at that time, imperial forces were close to defeating the rebel general Li Tongjie, who controlled neighboring Henghai (橫海) around modern Cangzhou, Hebei. Shi became apprehensive. Under the advice of his son Shi Xiaozhang (史孝章), Shi offered to surrender control of Weibo to the imperial government and requested a transfer to another command elsewhere. The reigning Emperor Wenzong reacted by commissioning Shi Xiancheng as the military governor of Hezhong (河中) around modern Yuncheng, Shanxi, and Li Ting (李聽), the military governor of Yicheng (義成) around modern Anyang, Henan, as the new military governor of Weibo. He also carved out three of Weibo's six prefectures—Xiang (相州) and Chan (澶州) around modern Anyang and Wei (衛州) around modern Xinxiang, Henan—to create a new territory where Shi Xiaozhang would serve as military governor.

Thereafter, Shi Xiancheng prepared to depart Wei Prefecture. It was said that he stripped the headquarters and treasury of its treasures, ready to take them to Hezhong, and this angered the soldiers. The soldiers mutinied and killed Shi Xiancheng, and they supported He Jintao to be their leader. When Li Ting subsequently arrived at Weizhou, He Jintao refused to let him enter and then made a surprise attack, defeating him. At that time, the imperial treasury was drained and the imperial government, judging that it could not defeat He Jintao, capitulated and made him the military governor of Weibo. It further returned Xiang, Wei, and Chan prefectures to him.

=== Service as jiedushi ===
It was said that as the military governor of Weibo, He Jintao was favored by his people. He died in 840, and the reigning Emperor Wuzong (Emperor Wenzong's younger brother) allowed his son He Chongshun to inherit his position.
