= Han Yunzhong =

Han Yunzhong (Chinese: 韓允中) (814–874), né Han Junxiong (韓君雄), was a general of the Chinese Tang dynasty who seized control of Weibo Circuit (魏博, headquartered in modern Handan, Hebei) in a mutiny and subsequently ruled it as its military governor (Jiedushi) in de facto independence from the imperial government.

== Background ==
Han Junxiong was born in 814, during the reign of Emperor Xianzong. His family was from Wei Prefecture (魏州, in modern Handan, Hebei), the capital of Weibo Circuit. His father Han Guochang (韓國昌) was a long-time officer in the Weibo army under the military governor He Hongjing. Because of his heritage, Han Junxiong started serving in the military in his youth, and subsequently served in a campaign in 833–834, during the reign of Emperor Xianzong's grandson Emperor Wuzong, with his father Han Guochang, where He Hongjing joined the imperial forces in attacking Liu Zhen, who had seized neighboring Zhaoyi Circuit (昭義, headquartered in modern Changzhi, Shanxi) without imperial sanction.

== Seizure of Weibo Circuit ==
By 870, during the reign of Emperor Wuzong's cousin Emperor Yizong, He Hongjing's son He Quanhao was the military governor. He Quanhao was harsh in his discipline, and at that time, there were rumors that He Quanhao was set to reduce the food and clothing stipends for the soldiers. The soldiers mutinied, and He Quanhao was killed in flight. The soldiers supported Han Junxiong as their leader. With Wang Jingchong the military governor of neighboring Chengde Circuit (成德, headquartered in modern Shijiazhuang, Hebei) supporting the request, Emperor Yizong commissioned Han as the acting military governor, with Emperor Yizong's son Li Yan the Prince of Pu nominally serving as military governor. In 871, Han was officially commissioned as full military governor.

In 873, Emperor Yizong died, and Li Yan succeeded him (as Emperor Xizong). Emperor Xizong, upon ascending the throne, commissioned a number of military governors with honorary chancellor designations, and Han was given the honorary designation Tong Zhongshu Menxia Pingzhangshi (同中書門下平章事). Emperor Xizong also gave him a new personal name, Yunzhong (meaning "fair").

In 874, Han Yunzhong died. The soldiers supported his son Han Jian, who was then deputy military governor, as his successor, and Emperor Xizong subsequently approved.

== Commemoration ==
- Han Family Tombs (韩氏家族墓地), a monumental complex at the graves Han Yunzhong and his relatives. The complex includes a pair of giant tortoise-borne stelae (reminiscent of those at Shou Qiu) and other assorted statuary, in the spirit way tradition. It is on the national list of major historical and cultural sites. The complex is located near in Shandong's Shen County, near Liangpiying Village (梁丕营村) of Dongduzhuang Town (董杜庄镇).

== Notes and references ==
- Old Book of Tang, vol. 181.
- New Book of Tang, vol. 210.
- Zizhi Tongjian, vol. 252.
