= Li Baozhen =

Tang dynasty general (733-794)

Li Baozhen (Chinese: 李抱真) (733–794), né An Baozhen (安抱真), courtesy name Taixuan (太玄), formally the Prince of Yiyang (義陽王), was a general of the Chinese Tang dynasty. He initially distinguished himself as deputy for his cousin Li Baoyu, and after Li Baoyu's death came into command of his own. He played substantial roles in fighting the rebellions during Emperor Dezong's reign against Zhu Tao, Wang Wujun, Tian Yue, and Li Na; and later in persuading Wang, Tian, and Li to again submit to Emperor Dezong.

== Background and early life ==
An Baozhen was born in 733, during the reign of Emperor Xuanzong. He was probably the 10th-born son. His family was originally from Parthia but had lived for generations in the Hexi region. His great-grandfather An Xiuren (安脩仁) was a contributor to the Tang dynasty's establishment, having assisted his brother An Xinggui (安興貴) in overthrowing Li Gui, the Emperor of Liang, during the transition from Sui to Tang, subsequently uniting the Liang state with Tang.

The An family was renowned for its capability in tending horses. A number of family members eventually moved to the region around the Tang capital Chang'an and became students of literature, intermarrying with scholar-bureaucratic families. An Baozhen was noted as a deep yet decisive thinker.

=== Surname change ===
An Baozhen later served under his third cousin An Baoyu (a great-grandson of An Xinggui). In 757, during the Anshi Rebellion, An Baoyu requested a surname change because he did not want to share a surname with the rebel Yan state's emperor, An Lushan. Emperor Xuanzong's son and successor, Emperor Suzong, agreed and bestowed the imperial surname of Li on An Baoyu. Presumably, An Baozhen's surname was also changed to Li at this time, as Emperor Suzong permitted the entire clan to change its designated home to the capital Chang'an.

== Service under Emperor Daizong ==
After Emperor Suzong died in 762 and was succeeded by his son Emperor Daizong, Li Baoyu, who held a command as a military governor (jiedushi), received the additional command of Zelu Circuit (澤潞, headquartered in modern Changzhi, Shanxi). He highly valued Li Baozhen's service under him.

=== The Pugu Huai'en rebellion ===
At one point, Li Baozhen was appointed the secretary general of Fen Prefecture (汾州, in modern Linfen, Shanxi), when it appeared that the general Pugu Huai'en—who controlled the region and commanded the powerful Shuofang Circuit army (朔方, headquartered in modern Yinchuan, Ningxia)—was set on rebelling against Emperor Daizong.

Li Baozhen slipped away in 764 and fled back to Chang'an. When Emperor Daizong asked him for his counsel, Li Baozhen suggested recommissioning the general Guo Ziyi, who was formerly Pugu's superior as the commander of the Shuofang army, arguing that this move would undermine the morale of Pugu's troops. Emperor Daizong agreed; Pugu subsequently rebelled but was unsuccessful.

=== Administrative assignments and military innovations ===
Crediting Li Baozhen for his strategic insights, Emperor Daizong made him the deputy military governor of both Zelu and Chenzheng (陳鄭, headquartered in modern Zhengzhou, Henan) Circuits, both of which were under Li Baoyu's command. When Li Baozhen met Emperor Daizong to express his gratitude, he stated: "Whether the people have to labor or can rest depends on their prefect. I would like to receive a prefecture to try myself."

Emperor Daizong approved his volunteering and made him the prefect of Ze Prefecture (澤州, in modern Jincheng, Shanxi), one of the prefectures of Zelu Circuit. He served at Ze Prefecture for two years and was then moved to Huai Prefecture (懷州, in modern Jiaozuo, Henan), which was merged into Zelu. He served there for eight years. Because Li Baoyu was stationed at Fengxiang (鳳翔, in modern Baoji, Shaanxi) on the western border with the Tufan, Li Baozhen was left in effective command of Zelu.

Li Baozhen anticipated an eventual war against several circuits commanded by independent warlord generals who only nominally submitted to Tang authority:

- Pinglu (平盧, headquartered in modern Weifang, Shandong)
- Lulong (盧龍, headquartered in modern Beijing)
- Weibo (魏博, headquartered in modern Handan, Hebei)
- Chengde (成德, headquartered in modern Shijiazhuang, Hebei)
- Zhaoyi (昭義, headquartered in modern Anyang, Henan)
- Shannan East (山南東道, headquartered in modern Xiangfan, Hubei)

Believing Zelu occupied a strategic yet vulnerable position, and facing a severe post-rebellion shortage of military manpower and financial resources, Li Baozhen created an innovative program. He selected the strongest local farmers and waived their tax burdens; in exchange, they trained in archery, with the most capable receiving rewards. Within three years, he trained an elite army of 20,000 men. It was said at the time that no other infantry in the realm could rival Zelu's.

In 776, after Zhaoyi Circuit was largely seized by Tian Chengsi (the military governor of Weibo Circuit) following the death of its governor Xue Song, and the succeeding imperial military governor Li Chengzhao (李承昭) fell ill, Li Baozhen was given the deputy military governorship of Zhaoyi as well, merging Zhaoyi and Zelu. Following Li Baoyu's death in 777, Li Baozhen continued to command the merged Zhaoyi Circuit as deputy military governor.

== Campaigns during Emperor Dezong's reign ==
Emperor Daizong died in 779 and was succeeded by his son Emperor Dezong. In 780, Emperor Dezong officially promoted Li Baozhen to full military governor of Zhaoyi.

=== The coalition against Tian Yue ===
In 781, Emperor Dezong attempted to reassert imperial authority by refusing to allow Li Weiyue to succeed his father Li Baochen in Chengde, or Li Na to succeed his father Li Zhengji in Pinglu. In response, Li Weiyue, Li Na, and Tian Yue (the military governor of Weibo) revolted against the imperial forces. As part of their operations, Tian attacked Linming (臨洺, in modern Handan), which was defended by the Zhaoyi general Zhang Pi (張伾).

Li Baozhen sought aid from the imperial government. Emperor Dezong dispatched the general Ma Sui (the military governor of Hedong Circuit) and a commanding general of the imperial Shence Army (神策軍), Li Sheng, to reinforce him. Together, Ma, Li Baozhen, and Li Sheng defeated Tian at Linming, forcing him to flee back to his headquarters at Wei Prefecture.

In the spring of 782, joined by Li Qiu (李艽, the military governor of Heyang Circuit), they defeated Tian again at the Huan River (洹水, flowing through modern Handan). In the aftermath of the battle, Tian's subordinate Li Changshun (李長春) prepared to surrender Wei Prefecture to imperial forces. However, because Ma and Li Baozhen clashed personally, their advance stalled. It took ten days for imperial forces to arrive at Wei Prefecture, by which time Tian had fled back, executed Li Changchun, and successfully secured the city defenses. This animosity between Ma and Li Baozhen originated when Ma, while defending Heyang, sheltered Li Baozhen's insubordinate subordinate Yang Shu (楊鉥), the prefect of Huai Prefecture, and petitioned the emperor on Yang's behalf.

=== Warlord alliances and diplomatic maneuvers ===
Later in 782, Li Weiyue's subordinate Wang Wujun turned on and killed his master, briefly submitting to the Tang. He quickly rebelled again, however, when Emperor Dezong broke an implicit promise to grant him the full governorship of Chengde, splitting it into three smaller circuits instead. When Wang revolted and attacked Zhao Prefecture, the dispute between Ma and Li Baozhen nearly broke out into the open; Li Baozhen sent a detachment to secure his own neighboring territory of Xing Prefecture (邢州, in modern Xingtai, Hebei), which angered Ma into threatening a complete withdrawal. Li Sheng successfully moderated the dispute, Ma and Li Baozhen reconciled, and Ming Prefecture (洺州, in modern Handan) was added to Zhaoyi's command.

Subsequently, Zhu Tao (the deputy military governor of Lulong) turned against the Tang after being denied a share of Chengde territory and marched to aid Tian Yue and Wang Wujun. The combined rebel forces dealt a major defeat to the imperial armies, forcing them onto the defensive around Wei Prefecture. The four rebel leaders then declared themselves independent princes—Zhu as Prince of Ji, Wang as Prince of Zhao, Tian as Prince of Wei, and Li Na as Prince of Qi—though they continued using the Tang era name to maintain nominal allegiance.

A rift soon formed between Zhu Tao and Wang Wujun when Zhu failed to return quickly to Wei Prefecture after defending his own circuit from a surprise attack by Li Sheng. Exploiting this situation, Li Baozhen sent his subordinate Jia Lin (賈林) to urge Wang to return to the imperial fold. Wang agreed on the condition that Emperor Dezong issue a general pardon, but no pardon was granted at the time. Nevertheless, a secret diplomatic line was established between Li Baozhen and Wang.

=== The Jingyuan mutiny and reconciliation ===
In the autumn of 783, the army of Jingyuan Circuit (涇原, headquartered in modern Pingliang, Gansu) mutinied at Chang'an, forcing Emperor Dezong to flee to Fengtian (奉天, in modern Xianyang, Shaanxi). The mutineers supported Zhu Tao's brother, Zhu Ci, who declared himself emperor of a new state of Qin and besieged Dezong at Fengtian.

Upon hearing this news, the eastern imperial coalition scattered:

- Ma Sui and Li Qiu retreated to protect their own circuits.
- Li Baozhen took up a defensive posture at Linming.
- Li Huaiguang marched toward Chang'an to relieve the emperor.

When Tian Yue attempted to persuade Wang Wujun and Zhu Tao's subordinate Ma Shi (馬寔) to join him in attacking Li Baozhen at Linming, Li Baozhen had Jia Lin secretly convince Wang that the battle would only benefit Weibo, while a defeat would cripple Hengji's army. Wang declined the invitation and withdrew his forces.

Jia Lin further pointed out to Wang that Zhu Tao's title of "Prince of Ji" signaled an ambition to seize Wang's own Ji Prefecture, and that Zhu Tao was coordinating with Huige forces to march south and join Zhu Ci. Convinced, Wang formed a secret pact with Li Baozhen and Ma Sui to turn against Zhu Tao. Wang then successfully persuaded Tian Yue and Li Na to break with Zhu Tao as well.

In 784, when Wang, Tian, and Li Na publicly renounced their princely titles, Emperor Dezong accepted their pledges of allegiance, restored their titles as military governors, and honored Li Baozhen with the title of honorary chancellor.

Tian Yue was subsequently assassinated and succeeded by his cousin Tian Xu, who remained aligned with the imperial government. When Zhu Tao and his Huige allies attacked Tian Xu, Li Baozhen and Wang Wujun marched to his aid. Due to their long-standing regional rivalry, the two relieving armies deeply suspected one another. To demonstrate absolute good faith, Li Baozhen entered Wang's camp with only a handful of guards and slept there. Deeply moved, Wang declared, "My body has been promised to Brother Ten and will die for you." Together, they decisively defeated Zhu Tao, forcing him to retreat to Lulong and end his campaign.

== Later years and demise ==
For his vital contributions, Emperor Dezong created Li Baozhen the Duke of Ni, and subsequently the Prince of Yiyang. Early in the Zhenyuan era (785–805), Li Baozhen visited Chang'an to pay homage to the emperor before returning to Zhaoyi. In 787, when Emperor Dezong attempted to place him in charge of military campaigns to reclaim western prefectures lost to the Tufan, Li Baozhen declined. The Song dynasty historian Sima Guang attributed this refusal to Li Baozhen's anger over the emperor relieving Li Sheng of his military command earlier that year at the machination of chancellor Zhang Yanshang.

During this period of peace, Li Baozhen sought out talented individuals across the realm, rewarding those who offered useful counsel and dismissing those who did not. He constructed numerous lavish pavilions and artificial lakes for his amusement and surrounded himself with alchemists in a quest for immortality.

One alchemist, Sun Jichang (孫季長), manufactured golden alchemical pills for him, claiming they would grant eternal life. Li Baozhen trusted Sun completely, telling his subordinates, "This is something that not even Qin Shi Huang or Emperor Wu of Han was able to have. I will soon be at the court of Shangdi and no longer be among you." Having dreamed of riding a flying crane, he constructed a wooden crane and practiced riding it.

Ultimately, Li Baozhen ingested a total of 20,000 alchemical pills, causing his abdomen to become completely rigid and preventing him from eating. A Taoist monk, Niu Dongxuan (牛洞玄), temporarily relieved his condition using lard and laxatives. Once healed, however, Li Baozhen listened to Sun Jichang again, who urged, "You have come close to immortality. Why abandon it now?" Li Baozhen consumed another 3,000 pills and died from poisoning in 794. Emperor Dezong mourned his death for three days and granted him high posthumous honors.

== Succession crisis ==
During Li Baozhen's terminal illness, his son Li Jian (李緘) conspired with Li Baozhen's subordinate Lu Huichang (盧會昌) and nephew Yuan Zhongjing (元仲經) to seize control of Zhaoyi Circuit. Following Li Baozhen's death, Yuan concealed the passing, pretended the general was still alive, and forged an order transferring command to Li Jian.

Li Baozhen's deputy, Li Shuo (李說), along with other subordinates, initially acquiesced to the order. Lu Huichang then forged an official petition to the throne requesting that Emperor Dezong permit Li Jian to succeed his father. However, Emperor Dezong had already received reports of Li Baozhen's death. He dispatched the eunuch Diwu Shoujin (第五守進) to Zhaoyi with imperial orders transferring the command to another subordinate, Wang Yan'gui (王延貴). When Li Jian considered military resistance, his officers refused to back him. He yielded command and traveled to Luoyang under imperial orders.

== Notes and references ==
- Zizhi Tongjian, vols. 223, 225, 226, 227, 228, 229, 230, 231, 232, 235.
