= He Hongjing =

General of the Chinese Tang dynasty

He Hongjing (Chinese: 何弘敬; c. 806–c. 866), né He Chongshun (何重順), formally the Duke of Chu (楚公), was a general of the Chinese Tang dynasty, who ruled Weibo Circuit (魏博, headquartered in modern Handan, Hebei) as its military governor (jiedushi) in de facto independence from the imperial government.

== Background ==
It is not completely clear when He Chongshun was born, but it appeared that he was born in either 806 or 807. His father He Jintao was an officer of Weibo Circuit, and had served under the military governors Tian Hongzheng and Shi Xiancheng. In 829, when, at Shi's request, Emperor Wenzong transferred Shi to Hezhong Circuit (河中, headquartered in modern Yuncheng, Shanxi) and divided Weibo into two circuits—Weibo, with the imperial general Li Ting (李聽) as military governor, and carving out three prefectures to have Shi's son Shi Xiaozhang (史孝章) as military governor—the Weibo soldiers mutinied under He Jintao's leadership and killed Shi Xiancheng. Eventually, after He Jintao defeated Li Ting in battle, the imperial government capitulated, reversed the division of Weibo, and made He Jintao military governor.

In 840, He Jintao died, and the soldiers supported He Chongshun to serve as acting military governor. Initially, the imperial government had Li Zhifang (李執方) the military governor of Hezhong and Liu Yue (劉約) the military governor of Yichang Circuit (義昌, headquartered in modern Cangzhou, Hebei) write He Chongshun, encouraging him to submit control of Weibo to the imperial government and go to the capital Chang'an to pay homage to Emperor Wenzong's brother and successor Emperor Wuzong, but after He Chongshun refused to follow their suggestions, relented, as Emperor Wuzong, new to the throne, did not want to fight a campaign against Weibo. Emperor Wuzong thereafter made his granduncle Li Wan (李綰) the Prince of Fu the nominal military governor of Weibo while commissioning He Chongshun the deputy military governor. In 841, Emperor Wuzong made He Chongshun the military governor.

== As military governor ==
=== Before and during the Zhaoyi campaign ===
In 843, Emperor Wuzong gave He Chongshun the new name of Hongjing.

Also in 843, Liu Congjian the military governor of Zhaoyi Circuit (昭義, headquartered in modern Changzhi, Shanxi) died, and his adopted son (and biological nephew) Liu Zhen took control of Zhaoyi without imperial sanction. The lead chancellor Li Deyu, believing that He Hongjing and fellow de facto independent military governor Wang Yuankui, of Chengde Circuit (成德, headquartered in modern Shijiazhuang, Hebei), could be persuaded to not support Liu Zhen and instead fight for the imperial cause, suggested that Emperor Wuzong issue them an edict that pointed out that the imperial government had been allowing Weibo and Chengde to be in de facto independence, but that Zhaoyi's situation was different, implicitly guaranteeing continued imperial noninterference if they acted against Zhaoyi. It was said that when He Hongjing and Wang Yuankui received the edict, they, in apprehension, agreed. Subsequently, Emperor Wuzong put Wang and He Hongjing in charge of capturing the three Zhaoyi prefectures east of the Taihang Mountains. Specifically, He Hongjing was ordered to attack Ming Prefecture (洺州, in modern Handan).

However, He Hongjing, while accepting the imperial orders, was trying to intercede on Liu's behalf, and Liu himself was also begging the imperial government for forgiveness. Emperor Wuzong ignored Liu's and He Hongjing's pleas. Meanwhile, Wang was attacking Zhaoyi territory, but He Hongjing was not. Wang thus submitted secret reports accusing He Hongjing of duplicity. Emperor Wuzong initially took a conciliatory stand, issuing an edict to He Hongjing stating that he understood that He Hongjing was filially pious to his mother and did not want to venture far. However, subsequently, under Li Deyu's advice, Emperor Wuzong pressured He Hongjing by ordering the imperial general Wang Zai the military governor of Zhongwu Circuit (忠武, headquartered in modern Xuchang, Henan) to take the Zhongwu troops through Weibo territory to attack Zhaoyi's Ci Prefecture (磁州, in modern Handan as well). He Hongjing, hearing that Wang Zai would pass through his territory, feared that Wang Zai's presence would disrupt the loyalty of the Weibo soldiers toward him, quickly launched troops and attacked Ci Prefecture himself, capturing Feixiang (肥鄉, in modern Handan) and Ping'en (平恩, in modern Handan as well) Counties. After He Hongjing engaged Zhaoyi troops, Emperor Wuzong, believing that he had shown his faithfulness, diverted Wang Zai's troops to Heyang Circuit (河陽, headquartered in modern Jiaozuo, Henan), which had been defeated several times by Zhaoyi troops, instead, and also bestowed the honorary title of acting Zuo Pushe (左僕射) on He Hongjing.

In 844, the Zhaoyi officer Wang Zhao (王釗), fearing that Liu would punish him for his continued military failures, surrendered Min Prefecture to He Hongjing. The Zhaoyi officer An Yu (安玉), hearing that Wang Zhao had surrendered to He Hongjing and that Pei Wen (裴問) and Cui Gu (崔嘏) had surrendered Xing Prefecture (邢州, in modern Xingtai, Hebei) to Wang Yuankui, also surrendered Ci Prefecture to He Hongjing. After Liu's officer Guo Yi (郭誼) subsequently killed Liu and surrendered the remainder of Zhaoyi to the imperial government, Emperor Wuzong bestowed the honorary chancellor title of Tong Zhongshu Menxia Pingzhangshi (同中書門下平章事) on He Hongjing.

=== After the Zhaoyi campaign ===
In 859, by which time Emperor Wuzong's cousin Emperor Yizong was emperor, Emperor Yizong bestowed the honorary title of Zhongshu Ling (中書令) on He Hongjing. Emperor Yizong also created him the Duke of Chu.

In 866 (or possibly 865), He Hongjing died. The soldiers supported his son He Quanhao as his successor, and the imperial government subsequently approved.

== Notes and references ==
- Old Book of Tang, vol. 181
- New Book of Tang, vol. 210.
- Zizhi Tongjian, vols. 246, 247, 248, 249, 250.
