= Li Na (Tang dynasty) =

General and politician of the Chinese Tang Dynasty

Governor of Qi
- In office 781–792
- Preceded by: Li Zhengji
- Succeeded by: Li Shigu

Personal details
- Known for: the military governor

Li Na, or Yi Nab (李納; 759 – June 13, 792), formally the Prince of Longxi (隴西王), was a Chinese military general and politician of the Chinese Tang dynasty. Inheriting the post from his father Li Zhengji, he served as the military governor (jiedushi) of Pinglu Circuit (平盧, headquartered in modern Tai'an, Shandong) semi-independently from the imperial government.

== Background ==
Li Na was born in 758, during the reign of Emperor Suzong. His father Li Huaiyu, who was of Goguryeo extraction, was then serving as a military officer at Pinglu Circuit (then headquartered in modern Chaoyang, Liaoning) under Li Huaiyu's cousin Hou Xiyi (侯希逸), who was the acting military governor of the circuit at that time. By 761, however, the Pinglu army, which was cut off from the rest of the Tang realm by the rebel state of Yan at that time and had to further fend off not only Yan forces, but forces of Khitan and Xi tribes, could no longer stand, and it abandoned Pinglu Circuit and fought its way south. In 762, Emperor Suzong's son and successor Emperor Daizong made Hou the military governor of Ziqing Circuit (淄青, headquartered in modern Weifang, Shandong) as well, and the names of Ziqing and Pinglu merged. In 765, the soldiers overthrew Hou because he was overburdening them with labor, and they supported Li Huaiyu as his successor. Emperor Daizong agreed and made Li Huaiyu military governor, changing his name to Li Zhengji. Li Zhengji proceeded to, despite nominally submitting to imperial authority, rule Pinglu effectively as a semi-independent realm.

== Service under Li Zhengji ==
In Li Na's youth, Li Zhengji had put him in command of an army to aid in the seasonal defense of Tang's western border with Tufan, and Li Na, as part of this deployment, was at Chang'an to pay homage to Emperor Daizong. Emperor Daizong met him and gave him a number of honors. Later, after that deployment was over, Li Zhengji made him the prefect of Zi Prefecture (淄州, in modern Zibo, Shandong). During Li Zhengji's imperially-sanctioned campaign against Tian Chengsi, the military governor of Weibo Circuit (魏博, headquartered in modern Handan, Hebei) in 775, Li Na served as acting military governor in Li Zhengji's absence from Pinglu. Later, after a campaign against another rebellious military governor, Li Lingyao (李靈曜), Li Zhengji took five prefectures from Li Lingyao's Biansong Circuit (汴宋, headquartered in modern Kaifeng, Henan) and merged them into Pinglu Circuit. He then moved the headquarters of Pinglu from Qing Prefecture (青州) to one of the Biansong prefectures that he took, Yun Prefecture (鄆州, in modern Tai'an, Shandong), and made Li Na the prefect of Qing Prefecture, in charge of the old headquarters.

In 781, Li Baochen the military governor of Chengde Circuit (成德, headquartered in modern Shijiazhuang, Hebei) died, and his son Li Weiyue wished to inherit his position. Emperor Daizong's son and successor Emperor Dezong refused to grant imperial sanction. In light of this, Li Weiyue prepared for war against the imperial government, and Li Zhengji, Tian Yue (Tian Chengsi's nephew and successor), and Liang Chongyi the military governor of Shannan East Circuit (山南東道, headquartered in modern Xiangyang, Hubei), who had made an alliance to support each other in attempts to be able to pass their circuits to their descendants, prepared for war as well. After Li Zhengji himself died later in 781, Li Na initially kept his death a secret but, pursuant to the alliance, sent troops to aid Tian and Li Weiyue. In fall 781, he announced his father's death and requested to succeed Li Zhengji. Emperor Dezong denied his request as well.

== As rebel against imperial authority ==
In light of Emperor Dezong's refusal to let him succeed Li Zhengji, later in 781, Li Na attacked the imperially-controlled Xuanwu Circuit (宣武, headquartered in modern Shangqiu, Henan). While he was doing so, however, Li Wei (李洧), a cousin of Li Zhengji's, whom Li Zhengji had made the prefect of Xu Prefecture (徐州, in modern Xuzhou, Jiangsu), offered to submit to the imperial government, along with the prefects of Hai (海州, in modern Lianyungang, Jiangsu) and Yi (沂州, in modern Linyi, Shandong) Prefectures. In anger, Li Na attacked Xu Prefecture, joined by an army from Weibo, but was defeated by joint forces commanded by Liu Qia (劉洽); the military governor of Xuanwu Circuit; Qu Huan (曲環), a commander of the directly-imperially-controlled Shence Army (神策軍); Li Cheng (李澄), an officer of Yongping Circuit (永平, headquartered in modern Kaifeng); and Tang Chaochen (唐朝臣), an officer of Shuofang Circuit (朔方, then headquartered in modern Yinchuan, Ningxia). Li Na was forced to withdraw from his siege against Xu Prefecture, and in the aftermaths, he briefly lost Hai Prefecture and Mi Prefecture as well, but quickly recovered them. Li Na himself withdrew to Pu Prefecture (濮州, in modern Heze, Shandong), and Liu followed him there and put Pu Prefecture under siege. As, by that point, Tian Yue was also under siege at his headquarters at Wei Prefecture, Liang Chongyi had committed suicide after having been defeated by Li Xilie the military governor of Huaixi Prefecture (淮西, headquartered in modern Zhumadian, Henan), and Li Weiyue, under pressure from imperial forces, had been killed by his own officer Wang Wujun, who then submitted to imperial authority, it was believed that imperial authority would soon prevail over all of the rebels.

Indeed, by spring 782, Liu was initially making progress in capturing Pu Prefecture and took its outer city, so much so that Li Na got onto the city walls and tearfully begged Liu to allow him to surrender. With Li Mian the military governor of Yongping Circuit also persuading him to surrender, he had his subordinate Fang Shuo (房說) escort his brother Li Jing (李經) and son Li Chengwu (李成務) to Chang'an to submit. However, the eunuch Song Fengchao (宋鳳朝), arguing that Li Na was about to fall anyway, suggested to Emperor Dezong not to accept the surrender; Emperor Dezong therefore detained Fang, Li Jing, and Li Chengwu, and made no responses. Li Na thereafter withdrew out of Pu Prefecture and returned to Yun Prefecture, continuing to ally with Tian against the imperial government. Meanwhile, though, his De (德州, in modern Dezhou, Shandong) and Di (棣州, in modern Binzhou, Shandong) Prefectures submitted to imperial authority, but were subsequently seized by Zhu Tao the military governor of Lulong Circuit (盧龍, headquartered in modern Beijing), who was then considering rebelling against the imperial government (over his dissatisfaction that Emperor Dezong did not give him any part of Chengde's territory despite his contributions in Li Weiyue's destruction) but had not yet openly done so. Meanwhile, Emperor Dezong had also commissioned Li Xilie to be the military governor of Pinglu and ordered him to attack Li Na, but Li Xilie, who was then already in secret alliance negotiations with Li Na, took no actual actions against Li Na.

By winter 782, both Zhu and Wang (who was also displeased that he was not made a military governor despite his killing of Li Weiyue) were openly rebelling against the imperial government. They advanced south to aid Tian and dealt the imperial forces, under the commands of Li Huaiguang the military governor of Shuofang Circuit, Ma Sui the military governor of Hedong Circuit (河東, headquartered in modern Taiyuan, Shanxi), and Li Baozhen the military governor of Zhaoyi Circuit (昭義, headquartered in modern Changzhi, Shanxi), forcing them to lift the siege on Wei Prefecture. In light of their victory, they each claimed princely titles to show independence from Tang — Zhu as the Prince of Ji, Tian as the Prince of Wei, and Wang as the Prince of Zhao. They offered the title of Prince of Qi to Li Na, and Li Na accepted.

== As independent Prince of Qi ==
The four rebel princes offered their allegiance to Li Xilie, requesting that he take the throne himself as emperor. Li Xilie did not do so immediately, but also claimed a princely title of Prince of Jianxing. Meanwhile, in fall 782, soldiers from Jingyuan Circuit (涇原, headquartered in modern Pingliang, Gansu), at Chang'an to await deployment to the east, mutinied after Emperor Dezong did not give them rewards that they believed they deserved, forcing Emperor Dezong to flee to Fengtian (奉天, in modern Xianyang, Shaanxi). They supported Zhu Tao's brother Zhu Ci as their leader, and Zhu Ci claimed the title of emperor of a new state of Qin. He soon put Fengtian under siege, but had to lift the siege on Fengtian after Li Huaiguang arrived at Fengtian to save Emperor Dezong. However, he continued to occupy Chang'an.

While Emperor Dezong was at Fengtian, he sent messengers to Li Na, Tian Yue, and Wang Wujun, offering to pardon them if they submitted to him. Li Na, along with Wang and Tian, secretly agreed. After Emperor Dezong issued a general pardon in spring 784, Li Na, Tian, and Wang all renounced their princely titles and nominally resubmitted to Tang imperial authority. Emperor Dezong then commissioned Li Na as the military governor of Pinglu and, later in the year, gave him the honorary chancellor designation of Tong Zhongshu Menxia Pingzhangshi (同中書門下平章事) and created him the Prince of Longxi.

== As Tang subject again ==
Meanwhile, Li Xilie, who by this point had claimed the title of emperor of a new state of Chu, was putting Chen Prefecture (陳州, in modern Zhoukou, Henan) under siege, but could not capture it quickly. Li Na sent troops to aid Liu Qia, Qu Huan, and Li Cheng in trying to lift the siege on Chen Prefecture, and they succeeded in defeating Li Xilie's troops in winter 784. Thereafter, Emperor Dezong gave Li Na the honorary title of acting Sikong (司空, one of the Three Excellencies). Subsequently, in 786, after Li Cheng, who was then the military governor of Yicheng Circuit (義成, headquartered in modern Anyang, Henan), died and was succeeded by Jia Dan, Jia, as a neighbor of Pinglu Circuit, took a conciliatory stance toward Li Na, and Li Na reciprocated, reducing the tension between Pinglu and imperially-held circuits.

In 790, there were rumors that Li Na was planning to escort his subordinate Tian Chao (田朝), a son of Tian Chengsi's and an older brother to Weibo's then-military governor Tian Xu (who had killed Tian Yue and succeeded him in 784) back to Weibo to vie for control of Weibo Circuit. Tian Xu feared this, and, under suggestion by his staff member Sun Guangzuo (孫光佐), he sent gifts to Li Na to please him and persuade him to send Tian Chao to Chang'an — and further suggested Li Na to accept the surrender of the prefect of the previously Pinglu-controlled Di Prefecture, Zhao Gao (趙鎬), who had previously submitted to Wang Wujun's Chengde Circuit but who later refused to follow Wang's orders. Li Na therefore accepted Zhao's surrender and took Di Prefecture, despite Wang's attacks. Tian further cemented the relationship with Li Na by sending Sun to Pinglu's headquarters at Yun Prefecture (鄆州), announcing an imperial edict (which Tian Xu had forged) declaring Di Prefecture to be part of Pinglu Circuit. In anger, Wang sent his son Wang Shiqing (王士清) to attack Weibo's Bei Prefecture (貝州, in modern Xingtai, Hebei), occupying four counties of Bei Prefecture. In winter 790, Emperor Dezong, wanting to put an end to the campaigns between these circuits, ordered Li Na to return Di Prefecture to Chengde; Li Na demanded that Wang return the four counties of Bei Prefecture to Weibo first. Wang did so, and subsequently, Li Na returned Di Prefecture to Chengde.

Li Na died in 792. His subordinates supported his son Li Shigu to succeed him, and Emperor Dezong agreed.

== Bibliography ==
- Old Book of Tang, vol. 124.
- New Book of Tang, vol. 213.
- Zizhi Tongjian, vols. 225, 227, 228, 229, 230, 232, 233, 234.

Government offices
Preceded by Li Zhengji	Governor of Qi; 758–792	Succeeded by Li Shigu
