= Li Weiyue =

Chinese general

- Chinese: 李惟岳
Transcriptions
Standard Mandarin
- Hanyu Pinyin: Lǐ Wéiyuè
- Wade–Giles: Li Wei-yüeh

Li Weiyue (died 9 March 782) was a Chinese officer during the late Tang dynasty. His father Li Baochen was the military governor (jiedushi) of Chengde around present-day Shijiazhuang, Hebei, which he ruled in de facto independence from imperial control. After Li Baochen's death in 781, Li Weiyue tried to succeed him as the Chengde military governor and waged a campaign against the Tang when Emperor Dezong refused to let him do so. In 782, with his losses mounting, his own officer Wang Wujun killed him and submitted to imperial government.

== Life ==
=== Early years ===
The exact year of Li Weiyue's birth is unknown but, though his half-brother Li Weicheng (李惟誠) was older, he was considered Li Baochen's proper heir since he was the eldest son of Li Bochen's wife. Li also had at least one younger brother, Li Weijian (李惟簡).

Li Baochen had been a general of the rebel state of Yan during the Anshi Rebellion, but nominally submitted to the Tang in 762 in exchange for recognition as the lawful military governor (jiedushi) of Chengde. He ruled his province as a de facto independent state and wanted to eventually pass it on to Li Weiyue, who served as his chief general (行軍司馬, xingjun sima) and as the prefect of the provincial capital's Heng Prefecture. However, since Li Weiyue was considered young and weak willed, Li Baochen began to kill a number of his officers that he viewed as potential threats to his son. The only two major officers who escaped this fate were Zhang Xiaozhong, who remained in Yi Prefecture within modern Baoding, Hebei, and refused repeated summons by Li Baochen to report to Hengzhou, and Wang Wujun, whose son Wang Shizhen was a son-in-law to Li Baochen and brother-in-law to Li Weiyue.

=== Attempted succession to Changde ===
Li Baochen died in the spring of 781. Initially, Li Weiyue did not announce his father's death but forged an imperial petition in his father's name, requesting that Li Weiyue be allowed to succeed him as the military governor of Changde. Emperor Dezong refused and sent the imperial official Ban Hong (班宏) to visit Li Baochen. When Ban arrived in Chengde, he realized that Li Baochen had died and Li Weiyue tried to bribe him to recommend Li's succession to his father's office. Ban refused. Once Ban returned to the imperial capital Chang'an and reported everything to Emperor Dezong, Li Weiyue publicly announced his father's death and claimed the title of acting military governor. He had his subordinate officers submit an imperial petition requesting that he be formally commissioned as full military governor, but Emperor Dezong rejected that petition as well.

Li Weiyue thus prepared for war against the imperial government, aided by several other military governors who were also ruling their lands independently and who had previously entered into alliances with Li Baochen. These were Li Zhengji, the military governor of Pinglu (平盧) around modern Tai'an, Shandong; Tian Yue, the military governor of Weibo (魏博) around modern Handan, Hebei; and Liang Chongyi, the military governor of East Shannan Circuit (山南東道) around modern Xiangfan, Hubei. Hearing of this plan, Li Baochen's secretary Shao Zhen (邵真) tearfully begged Li Weiyue to reconsider and suggested that, if he arrested Li Zhengji's messengers and delivered them to Chang'an, he might gain sufficient trust to be lawfully commissioned to his office. The secretary general Bi Hua (畢華), however, argued that the imperial government might still not trust Li Weiyue anyway and, if Li Zhengji then attacked in response, Chengde would be defenseless. Li Weiyue sided with Bi. Li Weiyue's uncle Gu Congzheng (古從政) also opposed resisting the imperial government. He suggested that Li Weiyue should leave his half-brother temporarily in charge of his realm and go in person to Chang'an to pay homage to Emperor Dezong to establish more trust. Li Weiyue again refused, and Gu committed suicide.

Tian sent his officer Meng You (孟祐) north along with 5000 soldiers in order to aid Li Weiyue in his defense of Chengde, while he himself launched preemptive attacks on Zhaoyi (昭義) around Changzhi, Shanxi, then controlled by the imperial general Li Baozhen. By the fall of 781, however, Tian was being defeated by Li Baozhen and Ma Sui, to the point that he actually needed aid from both Li Weiyue and Li Zhengji's son and successor Li Na.

Meanwhile, pursuant to Emperor Dezong's orders, Zhu Tao, acting military governor of Lulong (盧龍) around modern Beijing, had launched a campaign against Chengde. Zhu was quickly able to persuade Zhang Xiaozhong to surrender Yi Prefecture to the imperial cause. Emperor Dezong then named Zhang the lawful new military governor of Chengde and ordered that Li Weiyue escort Li Baochen's casket to Chang'an. Li Weiyue again refused. In the winter of 781, Emperor Dezong formally declared Li Weiyue a renegade and removed all of his titles. He also decreed that those who turned against Li Weiyue would be pardoned and rewarded.

In spring 782, despite the defense put up by joint Chengde and Weibo effort, Zhu and Zhang captured Shulu (束鹿) in modern Shijiazhuang and then put Shenzhou under siege. Li Weiyue became deeply worried and Shao again suggested to him that he submit to the imperial government. Shao proposed that he first send Li Weijian to Chang'an to declare his intent, execute any officers who would not agree, leave his father-in-law Zheng Shen (鄭詵) in charge of his lands, and then personally head to Chang'an to pay homage to Emperor Dezong. Li Weiyue finally agreed and had Shao draft a petition. However, the news leaked and Meng informed Tian. Tian was incensed and sent his staff member Hu Ji (扈岌) to Li Weiyue, demanding Shao's death. Li Weiyue, in fear, beheaded Shao in Hu's presence and with Bi's encouragement. He then commanded 10,000 soldiers himself and joined forces with Meng, trying to recapture Shulu with Wang Wujun as his forward commander. By this point, though, there had been rumors that Wang would turn against Li Weiyue. Wang, fearing that Li Weiyue would believe these rumors, intentionally did not use his best efforts in attacking Shulu. Subsequently, Zhu and Zhang arrived and defeated Li Weiyue, forcing him to flee back to Hengzhou.

Li Weiyue began to suspect Wang—particularly after yet another officer, Kang Rizhi (康日知), surrendered Zhaozhou (趙州) in modern Shijiazhuang to the imperial cause—but his staff members urged him not to suspect Wang, as Wang was the only officer he could depend on by this point. Li Weiyue agreed, and put Wang Shizhen in charge of security while putting Wang Wujun in command of an army, assisted by Wei Changning (衛常寧), to try to recapture Zhaozhou.

As soon as Wang Wujun left Hengzhou, however, he considered surrendering to Zhang. Wei persuaded him that it would be his best course to simply turn against Li Weiyue and capture him. Wang agreed, and therefore turned his army around and headed back to Hengzhou. Wang Shizhen and Wang Wujun's associate Xie Zun (謝遵) opened the city gates to welcome Wang Wujun in. Wang Wujun then captured Li Weiyue and executed his close associates, including Bi, Zheng, and the powerful servant Wang Tanu (王它奴). Initially, because of Wang Wujun's prior service under Li Baochen, he considered sparing Li Weiyue and delivering him to Chang'an. Wei pointed out that if he did so, Li Weiyue might blame the entire rebellion on Wang instead. Wang therefore strangled Li Weiyue to death, cutting off his head for delivery to Chang'an.
