= Shi Xiancheng =

Shi Xiancheng (Chinese: 史憲誠) (died July 30, 829) was a general of the Chinese Tang dynasty, who ruled Weibo Circuit (魏博, headquartered in modern Handan, Hebei) semi-independently from the imperial government.

== Background ==
It is not known when Shi Xiancheng was born. His ancestors were of Xi stock, but had submitted to the Tang dynasty and resided at Lingwu. Both his grandfather Shi Daode (史道德) and father Shi Zhouluo (史周洛) served in the army of Weibo Circuit and, for their achievements, were created princes, with Shi Zhouluo having done so under the military governor (jiedushi) Tian Ji'an. Shi Xiancheng was known for bravery and served under his father Shi Zhouluo in the Weibo army.

By 819, during the reign of Emperor Xianzong, when Tian Hongzheng was serving as military governor and was following imperial orders in attacking the warlord Li Shidao, who ruled Pinglu Circuit (平盧, headquartered in modern Tai'an, Shandong), Shi Xiancheng served as Tian's forward commander in leading 4,000 soldiers across the Yellow River to attack Pinglu. With Weibo forces pressuring Pinglu's capital Yun Prefecture (鄆州) directly, Li's subordinate Liu Wu killed Li and surrendered. As a result of Shi's contributions, he was given the honorary title of deputy chief imperial censor (御史中丞, Yushi Zhongcheng).

== During Emperor Muzong's reign ==
As a result of Emperor Xianzong's military victories, the various circuits all submitted to his rule. After Emperor Xianzong died in 820 and was succeeded by his son Emperor Muzong, however, soldiers at Lulong (盧龍, headquartered in modern Beijing) and Chengde (成德, headquartered in modern Shijiazhuang, Hebei) Chengde rebelled under the leadership of Zhu Kerong and Wang Tingcou, respectively, in 821—and in Wang's uprising, he killed Tian Hongzheng, who had been transferred to Chengde Circuit. Tian's successor as military governor of Weibo, Li Su, was originally set to launch a campaign against Chengde when he fell ill. Emperor Muzong thus made Tian's son Tian Bu as the new military governor of Weibo.

Tian Bu trusted Shi from the time they served together under Tian Hongzheng, and he made Shi his forward commander, giving Shi the elite troops of Weibo. In winter 821, Tian Bu launched his 30,000 troops to attack Wang, capturing two Chengde outposts just south of Nangong (南宮, in modern Xingtai, Hebei). However, as recounted in a petition from Bai Juyi to Emperor Muzong at the time, he then became bogged down because his soldiers, who had been accustomed to rich rewards from the imperial government, lost their motivation. Meanwhile, as there were heavy snowstorms at the time, the supplies to be shipped by the imperial government's director of finances were not arriving, and Tian ordered that revenues be diverted from the six Weibo prefectures for military use—causing the officers to resent him for stripping the six prefectures of their wealth. Shi, who was ambitious, thus used this opportunity to foster dissent in the Weibo ranks. In spring 822, when there was an imperial order for some Weibo soldiers to report to the camp of Li Guangyan the military governor of Zhongwu Circuit (忠武, headquartered in modern Xuchang, Henan) to attack Chengde from the east, the Weibo soldiers largely deserted Tian and fled to Shi's camp. Tian was only able to maintain control over 8,000 soldiers and was forced to return to Wei Prefecture.

Once Tian returned to Wei Prefecture, he again discussed with his senior officers about launching another campaign against Chengde. The officers refused to follow his orders and stated that they would only follow him if he agreed to reassert independence from the imperial government. He saw the hopelessness of the situation he was in, and he wrote a final petition to Emperor Muzong and entrusting it to his staff member Li Shi (who would eventually be chancellor) and then committed suicide. Shi, upon hearing of Tian Bu's death, returned to Weibo's capital Wei Prefecture (魏州) and was subsequently supported by the soldiers to serve as acting military governor. He was soon confirmed by the imperial government as military governor. It was said that he was pleased by the imperial grace and therefore, on the surface, continued to be obedient to the imperial government, but was secretly conspiring with Zhu and Wang (both whom soon thereafter received imperial commissions of their own).

In 822, when soldiers at Xuanwu Circuit (宣武, headquartered in modern Kaifeng, Henan) rebelled against and expelled the military governor Li Yuan (李愿) under the leadership of Li Jie (李㝏), Shi supported Li Jie's request to be made military governor, and further postured by placing his troops at Liyang (黎陽, in modern Hebi, Henan) as if he would cross the Yellow River to aid Li Jie. However, after Li Jie's rebellion was subsequently crushed by an imperial campaign, Shi changed his attitude and said to the imperial official sent to confer with him, Wei Wenke (韋文恪):

I, Shi Xiancheng, is a barbarian. I am just like a dog who, even if it were battered, would not leave its master.

== During Emperor Jingzong's and Emperor Wenzong's reigns ==
In 826, by which time Emperor Muzong son Emperor Jingzong was emperor, Li Quanlüe (李全略) the military governor of Henghai Circuit (橫海, headquartered in modern Cangzhou, Hebei) died, and Li Quanlüe's son Li Tongjie seized control of the circuit without imperial sanction. Shi Xiancheng, who was connected to Li Quanlüe by marriage (one of Shi's children married one of Li Quanlüe's children), made a false report to the imperial government that Li Tongjie had been expelled by the Henghai troops and settled at Weibo, and then made another report that Li Tongjie had returned to Henghai.

Emperor Jingzong initially took no action against Li Tongjie. After he died later in the year and was succeeded by his brother Emperor Wenzong, in 827, Emperor Wenzong, not wanting to let Li Tongjie occupy Henghai, issued an edict making him the military governor of Yanhai Circuit (兗海, headquartered in modern Jining, Shandong) while transferring Wu Chongyin the military governor of Tianping Circuit (天平, headquartered in modern Tai'an—at Pinglu's old headquarters Yun Prefecture) to Henghai. Concerned that Shi and the other warlords would encourage Li Tongjie to resist, he conferred various honorary titles on them, and in Shi's case, he was made honorary chancellor with the title Tong Zhongshu Menxia Pingzhangshi (同中書門下平章事). When Li Tongjie subsequently refused to report to Yanhai, Emperor Wenzong issued an edict mobilizing the troops of Shi, Wu, Wang Zhixing the military governor of Wuning Circuit (武寧, headquartered in modern Xuzhou, Jiangsu), Kang Zhimu (康志睦) the military governor of Pinglu Circuit (whose headquarters had moved to modern Weifang, Shandong), Li Zaiyi the military governor of Lulong Circuit, Li Ting (李聽) the military governor of Yicheng Circuit (義成, headquartered in modern Anyang, Henan), and Zhang Bo (張播) the military governor of Yiwu Circuit (義武, headquartered in modern Baoding, Hebei) to attack Li Tongjie. However, Shi was initially planning on secretly aiding Li Tongjie. When he sent an officer to the office of the chancellors' at the capital Chang'an, however, the chancellor Wei Chuhou pointed out to Shi's officer that, while the senior chancellor Pei Du believed in Shi's faithfulness, Wei himself did not. Fearful that Wei would suggest to Emperor Wenzong that imperial troops act against him, Shi did not dare to aid LI Tongjie. Subsequently, in 828, with his son and deputy military governor Shi Tang (史唐) advocating sending troops against Henghai, Shi Xiancheng commissioned Shi Tang and the officer Qi Zhishao (亓志紹) to attack Henghai.

With imperial troops scoring victories over Henghai forces, Wang Tingcou, who was allied with Li Tongjie, could not save Li Tongjie, and instead sent messengers to persuade Qi to turn against Shi Xiancheng and Shi Tang to take over Weibo. In winter 828, Qi rebelled and marched back toward Wei Prefecture. Emperor Wenzong sent the official Bo Qi (柏耆) to Weibo to comfort Shi's troops, while ordering Yicheng and Heyang (河陽, headquartered in modern Luoyang, Henan) forces to aid Shi against Qi. Subsequently, the joint forces under Li Ting and Shi Tang defeated Qi, and Qi fled to Chengde.

With LI Tongjie near defeat, Shi was insecure about his own position. Shi Tang (whose name was soon changed to Shi Xiaozhang (史孝章)) suggested that he surrender his command and go to Chang'an to pay homage to Emperor Wenzong. In spring 829, Shi Xiancheng thus sent Shi Xiaozhang to Chang'an to offer to surrender his command. Subsequently, after Li Tongjie surrendered (but was nevertheless executed by Bo), Emperor Wenzong divided Weibo into two circuits—making Shi Xiaozhang the military governor of one of the new circuits, consisting of Xiang (相州, in modern Anyang), Wei (衛州, in modern Xinxiang, Henan, note different character than Weibo's capital prefecture), and Chan (澶州, in modern Anyang) Prefectures, while transferring Shi Xiancheng to Hezhong Circuit (河中, headquartered in modern Yuncheng, Shanxi) and Li Ting to Weibo. Emperor Wenzong also conferred the honorary chancellor title of Shizhong (侍中) on Shi Xiancheng.

Li Ting, however, did not report to Weibo immediately. Meanwhile, Shi Xiancheng was stripping the wealth of Weibo, intending to take the wealth with him to Hezhong. The soldiers, angry at him and fearful that he had effectively sold them out to the imperial government, mutinied and killed him under the leadership of He Jintao. When Li Ting arrived, He Jintao defeated him. Emperor Wenzong was forced to acknowledge He as military governor and further return the three prefectures originally given to Shi Xiaozhang. Shi Xiancheng was given posthumous honors, and Shi Xiaozhang would subsequently serve as military governor at three different circuits.

== Notes and references ==
- Old Book of Tang, vol. 181.
- New Book of Tang, vol. 210.
- Zizhi Tongjian, vols. 242, 243, 244.
