= Tian Huaijian =

Chinese Tang general

Tian Huaijian (Chinese: 田懷諫) (b. 802) was a general of the Chinese Tang dynasty, who, in his childhood, briefly served as the ruler of Weibo Circuit (魏博, headquartered in modern Handan, Hebei), which had been held by his family for generations. The soldiers soon overthrew him and replaced him with his distant relative Tian Xing, and he was delivered to the Tang capital Chang'an.

== Background ==
Tian Huaijian was born in 802, during the reign of Emperor Dezong. Prior to his birth, his family had held Weibo Circuit for generations, ruling it in a de facto independent manner from the imperial regime, with his great-grandfather Tian Chengsi, Tian Chengsi's nephew Tian Yue, Tian Huaijian's grandfather Tian Xu, and father Tian Ji'an successively serving as the military governors (jiedushi) of Weibo. His mother was Tian Ji'an's wife Lady Yuan, a daughter of the general Yuan Yi (元誼). He had least three brothers – Tian Huaili (田懷理), Tian Huaixun (田懷詢), and Tian Huairang (田懷讓), with the Old Book of Tang implying that he was older than his brothers and the New Book of Tang implying that he was younger than his brothers.

In 812, Tian Ji'an fell ill, and it was said that in his illness, he killed his subordinates at will, and the headquarters fell into chaos. Lady Yuan summoned the officers and had them support Tian Huaijian as deputy military governor, acting as military governor. Tian Ji'an was moved out of the headquarters into a separate residence, and he died a month later, on September 21, 812.

== Brief reign of Weibo ==
After Tian Ji'an's death, one of the officers who had been supported by the soldiers, Tian Xing – a son of Tian Chengsi's cousin Tian Tingjie (田庭玠) – was recalled from his post to serve as the commander of the army. Meanwhile, because of Tian Huaijian's youth, the servant Jiang Shize (蔣士則) came to be making the key decisions, and Jiang made movements that were based on his own likes and dislikes, causing the soldiers to be disgruntled. Further, the reigning Emperor Xianzong (Emperor Dezong's grandson) was withholding the official commission for Tian Huaijian, hoping to cause a mutiny at Weibo. One morning, when Tian Xing was set to enter the headquarters to meet Tian Huaijian, the soldiers surrounding him bowed to him, asking him to be active military governor. Tian Xing agreed on condition that the soldiers would not harm Tian Huaijian and would be willing to submit to imperial orders, and the soldiers agreed. Tian Xing then executed Jiang and his associates and moved Tian Huaijian out of the headquarters. (While the date of this mutiny was not recorded in historical sources, the mutiny was reported to Emperor Xianzong by the imperial eunuch stationed at Weibo on November 17, 812.)

== Aftermath ==
Tian Xing buried Tian Ji'an, and then delivered Tian Huaijian to the Tang capital Chang'an. Emperor Xianzong gave Tian Huaijian a general title, gave him a mansion at Chang'an, and granted a generous stipend of grain. No further historical references were made to Tian Huaijian, and it is not known when he died.

== Notes and references ==
- Old Book of Tang, vol. 141.
- New Book of Tang, vol. 210.
- Zizhi Tongjian, vols. 238, 239.
