= Tian Xu (Tang dynasty) =

Chinese general of the Tang dynasty era

- Traditional Chinese: 田緒
- Simplified Chinese: 田绪
Transcriptions
Standard Mandarin
- Hanyu Pinyin: Tián Xù
- Wade–Giles: T‘ien Hsü

Other names

Prince of Yanmen
- Traditional Chinese: 雁門王 鴈門王
- Simplified Chinese: 雁门王
- Literal meaning: King of Wild Goose Pass; Prince of Wild Goose Pass
Transcriptions
Standard Mandarin
- Hanyu Pinyin: Yànménwáng
- Wade–Giles: Yen-mên Wang

Tian Xu (764 – May 20, 796), formally the Prince of Yanmen, was a Chinese military general, monarch, and politician during the Tang dynasty who ruled Weibo Circuit (魏博, headquartered in modern Handan, Hebei) semi-independently from the imperial government.

== Background ==
Tian Xu was born in 764, during the reign of Emperor Daizong. At that time, his father Tian Chengsi was serving as the military governor (Jiedushi) of Weibo Circuit and ruling it semi-independently from the imperial government. He was Tian Chengsi's sixth son, out of 11. (Note: That Tian Xu was Tian Chengsi's sixth son was per his biographies in the Old Book of Tang and the New Book of Tang. However, the same volumes, also containing Tian Chengsi's biographies, listed Tian Chengsi's sons and had Tian Xu seventh in the lists.) As Tian Chengsi found his nephew (Tian Xu's cousin) Tian Yue to be more capable than his own sons, he had Tian Yue serve as his deputy and intended heir, having his sons assist Tian Yue. After Tian Chengsi died in 779, Tian Yue succeeded him as the military governor of Weibo Circuit with permission from Emperor Daizong, and Tian Xu thereafter served under Tian Yue.

== Service under Tian Yue ==
Because Tian Yue was thankful to Tian Chengsi for raising him and passing the circuit to him, he treated Tian Xu and his brothers with kindness. He put Tian Xu in charge of the headquarters guards. It was said that Tian Xu was violent and often committed crimes, but Tian Yue did not have the heart to give him heavy punishment, although on one occasion he whipped Tian Xu and briefly detained him, drawing resentment from Tian Xu. Tian Xu also resented Tian Yue because Tian Yue, frugal by nature, restricted his family members' monetary expenditures, such that Tian Xu felt that the expenditures were insufficient for him.

In 781, Tian Yue, along with several other military governors, rose in rebellion against Emperor Daizong's son and successor Emperor Dezong, but by 784, Emperor Dezong, who was then in desperate straits due to the rebellion at the capital Chang'an by Zhu Ci, issued a general pardon. Tian Yue accepted the general pardon, along with his allies Wang Wujun and Li Na, and they turned against another ally, Zhu Tao (Zhu Ci's brother), who had not accepted the pardon. After Tian Yue's submission, Emperor Dezong sent the imperial official Kong Chaofu (孔巢父) to Weibo to meet with Tian Yue, to thank him for his allegiance and to encourage the troops. Meanwhile, though, on one night in spring 784, while Kong was still at Weibo, Tian Xu was complaining to his brothers and nephews about Tian Yue, while he was drunk. When the nephew tried to stop his complaints, he killed his nephew. After he became sober, he realized what he had done, and worried that Tian Yue would kill him when he found out. He therefore took his followers, went to Tian Yue's headquarters, and killed Tian Yue, Tian Yue's mother, wife, and children. He then, issuing orders in Tian Yue's name, summoned Tian Yue's staff members Hu E (扈崿), Xu Shize (許士則), and Jiang Ji (蔣濟). When they arrived, Tian Xu killed them as well. However, Tian Xu then panicked and fled out of Weibo's capital prefecture Wei Prefecture (魏州). The senior officers Xing Caojun (邢曹俊) and Meng Xiyou (孟希祐), however, chased him down and offered the military governorship to him, as Tian Xu's remaining older brother, Tian Guan (田綸), was also killed in the disturbance. Tian Xu then declared that it was another officer, Liu Zhongxin (劉忠信), who had assassinated Tian Yue, and took over control of the circuit. Kong then commissioned him as the acting military governor. (The soldiers found out a few days later that it was actually Tian Xu who carried out the assassination, but by that point Tian Xu was firmly in control.) (Note: This version of Tian Xu's assassination of Tian Yue is per the Zizhi Tongjian. The Old Book of Tang and the New Book of Tang had somewhat different sequences of events, but all pointed to Tian Xu as Tian Yue's killer.)

== As acting Jiedushi and then Jiedushi ==
Zhu Tao, who was then attacking Weibo, was pleased to hear of Tian Yue's death and remarked that heaven was punishing Tian Yue through Tian Xu for his betrayal. He sent messengers to Tian Xu, offering an alliance; initially, Tian Xu agreed. However, after Tian Xu had more control of the situation in Weibo, both Li Baozhen and Wang Wujun sent messengers reaffirming that they were going to continue to uphold the alliance Tian Yue entered with them. His staff members Zeng Mu (曾穆) and Lu Nanshi (盧南史) persuaded him to remain faithful to the imperial camp, pointing out that the army of Zhu's Lulong Circuit (盧龍, headquartered in modern Beijing) had already laid waste to Weibo to the people's detriment. Tian Xu agreed with them and sent messengers to Emperor Dezong, pledging his loyalty. Emperor Dezong commissioned him as the military governor of Weibo. Soon thereafter, Li Baozhen and Wang defeated Zhu, forcing him to retreat back to Lulong.

In 785, Emperor Dezong gave his sister Princess Jiacheng in marriage to Tian Xu. She did not bear him any sons, but his concubines bore him three sons — Tian Jihe (田季和), Tian Jizhi (田季智), and Tian Ji'an. Although Tian Ji'an was the youngest, Princess Jiacheng adopted him as her child, and therefore, eventually, he became designated as Tian Xu's heir.

Meanwhile, Tian Xu was said to be cruel and extravagant as military governor, as he was wasteful and spent much time in drinking and sexual relations — activities that, while Tian Yue was alive, Tian Yue had curbed him from. In 790, there were rumors that Li Na, who governed Pinglu Circuit (平盧, headquartered in modern Tai'an, Shandong), whom Tian Xu's older brother Tian Chao (田朝) served under as prefect of Qi Prefecture (齊州, in modern Jinan, Shandong), was planning to escort Tian Chao back to Weibo to vie for control of Weibo Circuit. Tian Xu feared this, and, under suggestion by his staff member Sun Guangzuo (孫光佐), he sent gifts to Li Na to please him and persuade him to send Tian Chao to Chang'an — and further suggested Li Na to accept the surrender of the prefect of Di Prefecture (棣州, in modern Binzhou, Shandong), Zhao Gao (趙鎬), who had previously submitted to Wang's Chengde Circuit (成德, headquartered in modern Shijiazhuang, Hebei) but who later refused to follow Wang's orders. Li Na therefore accepted Zhao's surrender and took Di Prefecture, despite Wang's attacks. Tian further cemented the relationship with Li Na by sending Sun to Pinglu's headquarters at Yun Prefecture (鄆州), announcing an imperial edict (which Tian Xu had forged) declaring Di Prefecture to be part of Pinglu Circuit. In anger, Wang sent his son Wang Shiqing (王士清) to attack Weibo's Bei Prefecture (貝州, in modern Xingtai, Hebei), occupying four counties of Bei Prefecture. In winter 790, Emperor Dezong, wanting to put an end to the campaigns between these circuits, ordered Li Na to return Di Prefecture to Chengde; Li Na demanded that Wang return the four counties of Bei Prefecture to Weibo first. Wang did so, and subsequently, Li Na returned Di Prefecture to Chengde.

In 794, after Li Baozhen's death, his Zhaoyi Circuit (昭義, headquartered in modern Changzhi, Shanxi) fell into internal warfare between Emperor Dezong's appointed successor for Li Baozhen, Wang Qianxiu (王虔休), and Yuan Yi (元誼), the prefect of Ming Prefecture (洺州, in modern Handan). The battles waged on for more than a year, but by spring 796, Yuan had run out of strength, and he took 5,000 soldiers, as well as their families, and fled to Wei Prefecture. Emperor Dezong did not request Tian to give Yuan up, and instead ordered Tian to accept them, thus allowing Tian to take over those troops. Soon thereafter, as part of Emperor Dezong's bestowing of various honors on many military governors, he bestowed the honorary chancellor designation of Tong Zhongshu Menxia Pingzhangshi (同中書門下平章事) on Tian.

In summer 796, Tian Xu died suddenly. Initially, his staff members kept the death secret, and they supported Tian Ji'an, then age 14, to succeed him. Five days later, they publicly announced Tian Xu's death, and Tian Ji'an claimed the title of acting military governor, an act that Emperor Dezong later approved.
