= Tian Yue =

Tang Dynasty-era Chinese general and rebel (751-784)

Tian Yue (Chinese: 田悅) (751 – March 26, 784), formally the Prince of Jiyang (濟陽王), was a Chinese military general, monarch, and politician who, from 782 to 784, claimed the title of Prince of Wei independent from the Tang regime. Prior to that, he had already been ruling Weibo Circuit (魏博, headquartered in modern Handan, Hebei) in de facto independence from the Tang imperial government as its military governor (Jiedushi), having succeeded his uncle Tian Chengsi in 779. In 784, his cousin Tian Xu — a son of Tian Chengsi's — assassinated him and succeeded him shortly after he had nominally resubmitted to Tang imperial authority.

== Background ==
Tian Yue was born in 751, during the reign of Emperor Xuanzong. His father died early, and his mother remarried a soldier from Pinglu Circuit (平盧, then headquartered in modern Chaoyang, Liaoning). Subsequently, as the army that his stepfather belonged to abandoned the lands of Pinglu Circuit during the Anshi Rebellion and retreated south to Ziqing Circuit (淄青, headquartered in modern Weifang, Shandong, later renamed Pinglu as a result of this retreat), it was said that Tian Yue, accompanying his mother, moved between different places within Ziqing. In 763, his uncle Tian Chengsi, then the military governor (Jiedushi) of Weibo Circuit and ruling Weibo de facto dependently from the Tang imperial regime in the aftermaths of the Anshi Rebellion, sent people to look for him and found him. Tian Chengsi's emissaries brought Tian Yue back to Weibo. When Tian Yue met Tian Chengsi, he properly bowed down to his uncle, causing Tian Chengsi to be amazed and impressed. Tian Chengsi thus entrusted him with command of forces, and it was said that his opinions often matched Tian Chengsi's. After he was grown, it was said that he acted righteously and did not care about wealth, spending it in helping his soldiers, and thus drew their support. Tian Chengsi also favored his talent. Despite the fact that Tian Chengsi had 11 sons, he thus entrusted the most important affairs to Tian Yue, and had his sons assist Tian Yue.

== Service under Tian Chengsi ==
By 775, when Emperor Xuanzong's grandson Emperor Daizong waged a campaign to remove Tian Chengsi, indeed, Tian Yue, as Tian Chengsi's chief assistant, was named in Emperor Daizong's edict as the only other person than Tian Chengsi who would not be allowed to keep his posts — as Emperor Daizong stated that even the other Tian clan members, if they abandoned Tian Chengsi, would be allowed to do so. During the campaign, however, as part of Weibo's initial losses, Tian Yue suffered a defeat by several generals attacking Weibo from the south — Li Zhengji the military governor of Pinglu Circuit and Li Zhongchen the military governor of Huaixi Circuit (淮西, headquartered in modern Zhumadian, Henan) — at Chenliu (陳留, in modern Kaifeng, Henan). Subsequently, though, Tian Chengsi was able to exploit the ambitions of Li Zhengji and Li Baochen — themselves military governors who ruled their realms in de facto independent — to lead to the collapse of the imperial coalition, causing Emperor Daizong to abandon the campaign.

In 776, after the death of Tian Shenyu (田神玉) the acting military governor of Biansong Circuit (汴宋, headquartered in modern Kaifeng), his subordinate Li Lingyao (李靈曜) seized the circuit without imperial approval. Under Emperor Daizong's orders, the circuits around Biansong all launched forces against Li Lingyao, except for Weibo — indeed, Tian Chengsi decided to aid Li Lingyao and sent Tian Yue with an army to do so. Tian Yue had initial successes, defeating the forces of Li Zhengji's Pinglu Circuit and Li Mian's Yongping Circuit (永平, headquartered in modern Anyang, Henan), enabling him to advance to Biansong's capital Bian Prefecture to try to lift the siege against Li Lingyao. However, once he arrived there, Li Zhongchen had his office Li Chongqian (李重倩) launch a surprise night attack against Tian Yue's forces, causing the Weibo relief force to collapse, and Tian Yue was forced to flee back to Weibo. Subsequently, Bian Prefecture fell to Li Zhongchen and Ma Sui, and Li Lingyao was captured in flight by Li Mian and executed.

== As Jiedushi ==
In 779, Tian Chengsi died. At the recommendation of Li Baochen, Emperor Daizong allowed Tian Yue to inherit his post — initially as acting military governor, and then officially as military governor. Contrary to Tian Chengsi's defiant stance against the imperial government, Tian Yue was initially, on the surface, respectful and submissive, although he continued to rule his realm in a de facto independent manner. This continued after Emperor Daizong died later in 779 and was succeeded by his son Emperor Dezong, who took a harder line against military governors who had ambitions to rule independently. In 780, for example, when Emperor Dezong sent 11 officials as surveyors of the Tang realm, one of the surveyors Hong Jingguan (洪經綸) was responsible for surveying the Hebei region (河北, i.e., roughly modern Hebei, Beijing, and Tianjin). When Hong visited Weibo and heard that Weibo had 70,000 troops, he issued an order that Weibo reduce its army by 40,000. Tian Yue pretended to follow his orders and also issued an order cutting 40,000 soldiers from his army and sending them to farm. He then summoned those soldiers to be cut and stated to them, "You have long been in the army, and you all have parents, wives, and children. Now, if the surveyor forces you to leave the army, how are you going to feed your families?" Tian then spent his own wealth to pay for these soldiers and kept the 40,000 in the army. It was said that thereafter, the army were grateful to Tian and resentful of the imperial government. Nevertheless, pursuant to the customs of Emperor Daizong's time, when Emperor Dezong celebrated his birthday in summer 780, both Tian and Li Zhengji offered a large amount of silk to Emperor Dezong as a birthday gift. Emperor Dezong, instead of receiving them into the palace storage as his father would have, had the silk turned over to the imperial treasury for state use and announced that those were used to satisfy Weibo's and Pinglu's taxes — implicitly informing Tian and Li Zhengji that he was dissatisfied that Weibo and Pinglu were not paying taxes.

In spring 781, Li Baochen died. As there was an alliance between Weibo, Pinglu, Li Baochen's Chengde Circuit (成德, headquartered in modern Shijiazhuang, Hebei), and Liang Chongyi's Shannan East Circuit (山南東道, headquartered in modern Xiangfan, Hubei) for the military governors to pass their positions to their descendants, Li Baochen had previously supported Tian's succession. Tian thus in turn endorsed Li Baochen's son Li Weiyue to Emperor Dezong and requested that Li Weiyue be allowed to succeed Li Baochen. After Emperor Dezong refused, the four circuits readied for war against the imperial government, despite internal oppositions. In Tian's case, for example, his deputy Tian Tingjie (田庭玠, Tian Chengsi's cousin) opposed war against the imperial troops, but while Tian Yue remained respectful to Tian Tingjie, he did not follow Tian Tingjie's suggestion. Tian Tingjie subsequently resigned and soon thereafter died in sorrow. Tian Yue subsequently sent 5,000 soldiers, commanded by his officer Meng You (孟祐), to Chengde to aid Li Weiyue. Meanwhile, Tian Yue also personally decided to attack two prefectures near his realm held by the imperial government — Xing (邢州, in modern Xingtai, Hebei) and Ci (磁州, in modern Handan). (Xing and Ci Prefectures had been part of Zhaoyi Circuit (昭義, then headquartered in modern Anyang, Henan)), the realm of another military governor, Xue Song, but after Xue's death in 773, Tian Chengsi seized most of Zhaoyi and merged it into Weibo, although the imperial government took Xing and Ci Prefectures and merged them into Zelu Circuit (澤潞, headquartered in modern Changzhi, Shanxi), later renaming Zelu to Zhaoyi.) Tian Yue personally sieged Linming (臨洺, in modern Handan) and had his officer Kang Yin (康愔) siege Xing Prefecture. He also had another officer, Yang Chaoguang (楊朝光) set up obstacles to try to block any relief forcing coming from Zhaoyi's headquarters at Lu Prefecture (潞州). (These series of sieges were against the advice of the experienced officer Xing Caojun (邢曹俊), who suggested to Tian Yue that he personally make sure first that relief forces could not get through before putting Xing and Ci Prefectures under siege; otherwise, if imperial troops arrived while he was still sieging those prefectures, he would be bringing destruction on himself.) In fall 781, with Tian Yue still sieging Linming, the joint forces of three generals loyal to the imperial government — Ma Sui the military governor of Hedong Circuit (河東, headquartered in modern Taiyuan, Shanxi, Li Baozhen the military governor of Zhaoyi, and Li Sheng the commander of the imperial Shence Army (神策軍) — arrived and attacked, first defeating and killing Yang and then defeating Tian at Linming. Tian's army suffered more than 10,000 deaths, and he fled back toward Weibo's capital Wei Prefecture. He sought emergency aid from Chengde and Pinglu, and Li Weiyue and Li Na (Li Zhengji's son — Li Zhengji having died around the same time and entrusted the circuit to Li Na) each sent aid. However, in spring 782, at another battle on the banks of Huan River (洹水, flowing through modern Handan), the joint Weibo/Chengde/Pinglu forces were again crushed by the joint forces of Ma, Li Baozhen, Li Sheng, and Li Qiu (李艽) the military governor of Heyang Circuit (河陽, headquartered in modern Jiaozuo, Henan), suffering over 20,000 deaths.

Tian gathered only some 1,000 soldiers and fled back to Wei Prefecture in the dark. It was said that Ma and Li Baozhen did not get along with each other, and they did not coordinate, making it impossible for them to immediately trail Tian. When Tian arrived at Wei Prefecture, the officer he left in Wei Prefecture's defense, Li Changchun (李長春), refused to let him in, hoping that imperial forces would arrive to allow him to submit. However, imperial forces did not appear, and Li Changchun was forced to open the gates in the morning. Tian entered, executed Li Changchun, and put up a defense. Weibo was then in a desperate shape — as within Wei Prefecture there were only several thousand soldiers, and the family members of the dead were all mourning, so the city was filled with wailing and tears. Tian, in fear and depression, decided to publicly plead his case in order to earn back the people's loyalty. He personally rode a horse and held a knife outside his headquarters and gathered the people. In tears, he stated:

I, Tian Yue, lack talent, but it was with the endorsement of the two older gentlemen of Ziqing [(i.e., Pinglu)] and Chengde that I was able to inherit this post, and thus I did not measure my own strength before I decided to resist the will of the imperial government. It is because of me that we are in this lamentable state, with all these men suffering horrible deaths on my account. My old mother is still at home, so I cannot commit suicide. But I hope that you will take my sword, cut off my head, and surrender to General Ma. Seek your own fortunes, and do not die with me.

As he proclaimed this in sadness, he fell off his horse. The soldiers, hearing this, took pity on him and pledged to stay faithful to him. He thanked them and swore to treat them as brothers. He took out all of the wealth stored in the circuit treasury and gave them to the soldiers, and the hearts of the soldiers became more settled. He also summoned Xing Caojun and put him in charge of the defense, realizing that he should have listened to Xing earlier. Meanwhile, though, his subordinate Li Zaichun (李在春) surrendered Bo Prefecture (博州, in modern Liaocheng, Shandong) to imperial forces, and his cousin Tian Ang (田昂) did the same with Ming Prefecture (洺州, in modern Handan). When the imperial forces arrived at Wei Prefecture, however, Tian Yue had already readied his defenses for more than 10 days, and imperial forces were unable to easily capture Wei Prefecture.

Meanwhile, Li Weiyue was himself suffering heavy defeats at the hands of Zhu Tao the acting military governor of Lulong Circuit (盧龍, headquartered in modern Beijing) and Zhang Xiaozhong — a former Chengde officer who had joined the imperial cause. He thus considered renouncing the alliance with Tian and Li Na and offering to surrender to the imperial forces. When Meng You heard this and reported it to Tian, Tian angrily demanded Li Weiyue to execute the staff member who advocated this plan, Shao Zhen (邵真). Li Weiyue, intimidated by Tian's demands, executed Shao and did not surrender. However, after yet another major defeat at Zhu's and Zhang's hands, Li Weiyue's officer Wang Wujun turned against him and executed him, submitting to the imperial forces.

It was Emperor Dezong's mishandling of the situation after Chengde's fall that would give Tian a chance to survive, as Emperor Dezong made a series of moves that simultaneously alienated Zhu and Wang. He refused to give Chengde's Shen Prefecture (深州, in modern Hengshui, Hebei) to Lulong, as Zhu had requested. Rather, he divided the seven prefectures of Chengde into three smaller circuits, making Zhang the military governor of a newly created Yidingcang Circuit (易定滄, headquartered in modern Baoding, Hebei, soon renamed to Yiwu (義武)), consisting of three prefectures, while giving two prefectures each to Wang and Kang Rizhi (康日知, another Chengde general who had submitted to imperial authority during the campaign), with the lesser titles of military prefect (團練使, Tuanlianshi). Emperor Dezong, on paper, gave Lulong two additional prefectures — De (德州, in modern Dezhou, Shandong) and Di (棣州, in modern Binzhou, Shandong) — both still then held by Li Na. Zhu was angered by Emperor Dezong's refusal to give him any part of Chengde territory (in particular, Shen Prefecture) and requiring him to capture two additional prefectures on his own, while Wang was angered that contrary to Emperor Dezong's implicit promises to give whoever killed Li Weiyue Li Weiyue's offices, he not only received a lesser title, but was in a position where he could easily be destroyed. Tian Yue, who was then still under imperial attack, thus persuaded Zhu and Wang to join him in an alliance to defend against imperial forces. Zhu and Wang both agreed, although when Zhu further tried to persuade Zhang to join the alliance as well, Zhang refused. Subsequently, when Emperor Dezong ordered armies of Lulong, Yidingcang, and Wang's Hengji Circuit (恆冀, headquartered at Chengde's old capital of Heng Prefecture) to advance south to attack Weibo, Zhu and Wang not only refused but instead advanced south to aid Weibo. Tian, believing that aid was about to arrive, sent Kang Yin to battle Ma and was defeated again. In response to Zhu's and Wang's turning against imperial forces, Emperor Dezong sent Li Huaiguang the military governor of Shuofang Circuit (朔方, headquartered in modern Yinchuan, Ningxia), to join the imperial forces already sieging Wei Prefecture. However, when aid from both sides arrived, the overly confident Li Huaiguang ordered an attack with some initial successes, but ultimately suffered a major defeat at Zhu's and Wang's hands. The imperial forces withdrew across the river from Wei Prefecture, lifting the siege.

In the aftermaths of the imperial forces' defeat, Tian was grateful to Zhu, and offered to subjugate himself and Wang to Zhu — in effect, offering the emperor title to Zhu. Zhu declined, crediting Wang rather than himself for the victory. At the suggestion of Zhu's staff member Li Ziqian (李子千) and Wang's staff member Zheng Ru (鄭濡), they decided to each claim a princely title to show independence from imperial authority, but keep Tang's era name in order not to completely break from Tang. On December 9, 782, in an elaborate ceremony, Zhu claimed the title of Prince of Ji; Wang claimed the title of Prince of Zhao; Tian claimed the title of Prince of Wei; and they issued a letter offering Li Na the title of Prince of Qi. They also established administrations with governmental structures paralleling the Tang imperial government to further show independence, although the titles were intentionally different than Tang's to show some subordination.

== As self-proclaimed Prince of Wei ==
Meanwhile, though, as Zhu Tao's and Wang Wujun's troops were continuing to battle Tang imperial troops on Tian Yue's soil, all three of them were becoming financially drained. They pinned their hopes on alliance with yet another military governor with greater pretensions -- Li Xilie the military governor of Huaixi Circuit (淮西, headquartered in modern Xuchang, Henan), whose circuit was then wealthy. They, along with Li Na, thus sent emissaries to Huaixi, suggesting to Li Xilie that he take imperial title. Li Xilie did not do so immediately, but began to claim titles greater than the ones bestowed him by Emperor Dezong. (Li Xilie would eventually declare himself to be the emperor of a new state of Chu in spring 784, although without further pledge of allegiance by the four.)

In fall 783, after a mutiny by the soldiers of Jingyuan Circuit (涇原, headquartered in modern Pingliang, Gansu) at the capital Chang'an forced Emperor Dezong to flee to Fengtian (奉天, in modern Xianyang, Shaanxi), the Jingyuan soldiers supported Zhu Tao's brother Zhu Ci as their leader. Zhu Ci soon declared himself the emperor of a new state of Qin and put Fengtian under siege. With Emperor Dezong himself now under siege by Zhu Ci, Li Huaiguang and Li Sheng headed for Fengtian to save him, while Ma Sui and Li Qiu also left Weibo and returned to their circuits. Li Baozhen was left alone on the Weibo front, and Tian asked Wang and Zhu Tao's general Ma Shi (馬寔) to aid him in sieging Linming, where Li Baozhen was at the time. Li Baozhen, however, was able to persuade Wang that such a battle would do him no good regardless of the outcome — that if they were successful, it only benefited Weibo, while it they were not, Hengji would suffer heavy losses. Wang therefore carefully declined and returned to Hengji. As both he and Ma Shi departed, Tian held a grand feast sending them off in gratitude. Meanwhile, Emperor Dezong also sent emissaries to Wang, Tian, and Li Na, persuading them to again submit to Tang authority. All three secretly agreed, but for the time being remained in apparent alliance with Zhu Tao. When Zhu Tao, unaware of the development, requested Tian's assistance in advancing south to capture the eastern capital Luoyang and join forces with Zhu Ci, Tian, still thankful to him and not willing to refuse, initially agreed. After further persuasion from Wang, however, Tian was resolved against the plan.

When Emperor Dezong declared a general pardon in spring 784 — the scope of which included even Zhu Tao, Wang, Tian, Li Na, and Li Xilie and implicitly promising them that if they submitted to nominal imperial authority again, he would not dare to interfere with them again — Wang, Tian, and Li Na all renounced their self-claimed princely titles. However, Zhu Tao, unaware of this development, began his plan of march toward Luoyang in early 784. He went through Hengji and Weibo with great ceremonies of welcome from Wang and Tian. Eventually, when Zhu reached Yongji (永濟, in modern Handan) and requested that Tian join him in advancing to Luoyang, Tian refused. This drew Zhu's anger, and he divided his troops, along with Huige troops, in attacking several different Weibo cities. Tian put up his defense at Wei Prefecture, waiting for aid.

== Death ==
Meanwhile, Emperor Dezong had sent the imperial official Kong Chaofu (孔巢父) to Weibo to meet with Tian Yue, to thank him for his allegiance and to encourage the troops. He also created Tian the Prince of Jiyang. Meanwhile, though, on March 26, 784, while Kong was still at Weibo, Tian Yue's cousin Tian Xu (Tian Chengsi's son), whom Tian Yue had previously entrusted with great responsibilities but who had a number of faults, eventually leading to Tian Yue relieving him of his post and briefly putting him under arrest, was complaining to his brothers and nephews about Tian Yue, while he was drunk. When the nephew tried to stop his complaints, he killed his nephew. After he became sober, he realized what he had done, and worried that Tian Yue would kill him when he found out. He therefore took his followers, went to Tian Yue's headquarters, and killed Tian Yue, Tian Yue's mother, wife, and children. He then, issuing orders in Tian Yue's name, summoned Tian Yue's staff members Hu E (扈崿), Xu Shize (許士則), and Jiang Ji (蔣濟). When they arrived, Tian Xu killed them as well. He then declared that it was another officer, Liu Zhongxin (劉忠信), who had assassinated Tian Yue, and took over control of the circuit. (The soldiers found out a few days later that it was actually Tian Xu who carried out the assassination, but by that point Tian Xu was firmly in control.) Tian Xu and Zhu Tao initially made overtures to each other, although Tian Xu ultimately continued Tian Yue's policies and alliances with Li Baozhen and Ma Sui, leading to Zhu Tao's defeat.

== Notes and references ==
- Old Book of Tang, vol. 141.
- New Book of Tang, vol. 210.
- Zizhi Tongjian, vols. 225, 226, 227, 228, 229, 230.
