= Tian Hongzheng =

Chinese military general and politician

Tian Hongzheng (Chinese: 田弘正; 764 – August 29, 821), né Tian Xing (田興), courtesy name Andao (安道), posthumous name Duke Zhongmin of Yi (沂忠愍公), was a Chinese military general and politician of the Tang dynasty. Under his governance, Weibo Circuit (魏博; headquartered in modern-day Handan, Hebei), which had not been under the actual control of the Tang court for decades, submitted to imperial control, but he was killed by mutineers while later serving as military governor (jiedushi) of Chengde Circuit (成德; headquartered in modern-day Shijiazhuang, Hebei).

== Background ==
Tian Xing was born in 764, during the reign of Emperor Daizong. He was the second son of Tian Tingjie (田庭玠), a cousin of Tian Chengsi, who was then ruling Weibo Circuit as its military governor, in de facto independence from the imperial government. It was said that in Tian Xing's youth, he studied the Confucian classics but particularly military strategies. He was also said to be capable in horsemanship and archery, and was brave and polite. Tian Chengsi favored him and had him named Xing (meaning "prosperity"). After Tian Tingjie died in 782 in distress (after being unable to dissuade Tian Chengsi's nephew and successor Tian Yue from turning against the imperial government), Tian Xing's older brother Tian Rong (田融) became in charge of watching over his younger brothers. On one occasion, after Tian Xing won an archery contest among Weibo soldiers, Tian Rong battered him and told him, "If you do not keep your abilities hidden, disaster will come to you." Traditional historians credited Tian Rong's teaching for Tian Xing's ability to survive in the following years.

== Service under Tian Ji'an and Tian Huaijian ==
During the governance of Tian Chengsi's grandson Tian Ji'an (796–812), Tian Xing became the commander of the headquarters guards. It was said that Tian Ji'an was wasteful, uncaring of soldiers, and harsh in punishment, and Tian Xing often spoke to him, hoping to correct his behavior, and that the soldiers often looked up to Tian Xing for support. Tian Ji'an became suspicious of Tian Xing and demoted him out of the headquarters, to be the defender of Linqing (臨清, in modern Xingtai, Hebei), and considered executing Tian Xing. Tian Xing, in order to avoid disaster, pretended to suffer from paralysis. Meanwhile, by 812, Tian Ji'an himself fell ill and behaved erratically. Tian Ji'an's wife Lady Yuan had their 10-year-old son Tian Huaijian designated deputy military governor and acting military governor, and Tian Ji'an died shortly after. Tian Xing was recalled from Linqing to serve as the commander of the soldiers.

Meanwhile, because of Tian Huaijian's youth, the servant Jiang Shize (蔣士則) came to be making the key decisions, and Jiang made movements that were based on his own likes and dislikes, causing the soldiers to be disgruntled. Further, then-reigning Emperor Xianzong (Emperor Dezong's grandson) was withholding the official commissioning for Tian Huaijian, hoping to cause a mutiny at Weibo. One morning, when Tian Xing was set to enter headquarters to meet Tian Huaijian, the soldiers surrounding him and bowed to him, asking him to be active military governor. Tian Xing agreed under the conditions that the soldiers would not harm Tian Huaijian and would be willing to submit to imperial orders, and the soldiers agreed. Tian Xing then executed Jiang and his associates and moved Tian Huaijian out of the headquarters.

== As military governor of Weibo Circuit ==
Tian Xing presented maps and census rolls of the six prefectures of Weibo Circuit to Emperor Xianzong to show submission, and did not commission his own officials. After a debate between the chancellors Li Jifu (who advocated making Tian acting military governor) and Li Jiang (who advocated making Tian the official military governor immediately and further advocated a large money reward to the soldiers of Weibo for their submission), Emperor Xianzong agreed with Li Jiang. He sent the official Pei Du to Weibo to show approval and encouragement to Tian, and it was said that when Pei discussed with Tian the proper ways to be loyal, Tian was respectful and not bored in his hearing Pei's statements. He further accepted the imperial government's commissions of 90 officials below him—including the deputy military governor Hu Zheng (胡證)—without objection, submitted taxes that Tian Ji'an had withheld to the imperial treasury, and rebuffed attempts by Tian Ji'an's allied circuits—Pinglu (平盧, headquartered in modern Tai'an, Shandong), Chengde, and Zhangyi (彰義, headquartered in modern Zhumadian, Henan)—to bring him into the alliance. Emperor Xianzong also created him the Duke of Yi and gave him the honorary title of Yinqing Guanglu Daifu (銀青光祿大夫). Emperor Xianzong further gave him a new name—Hongzheng (meaning "magnification of righteousness").

As a result of Weibo's submission, the imperial forces stationed at Heyang Circuit (河陽, headquartered in modern Jiaozuo, Henan), which was stationed at Heyang, between Weibo and the eastern capital Luoyang to defend against Weibo, were moved to Ru Prefecture (汝州, in modern Pingdingshan, Henan) to instead defend against Zhangyi, whose military governor Wu Shaoyang had died earlier, and it was said that this movement pleased Tian Hongzheng greatly. When Emperor Xianzong did not allow Wu Shaoyang's son Wu Yuanji to succeed Wu Shaoyang, Wu Yuanji reacted by openly pillaging the surrounding circuits, and Emperor Xianzong declared a campaign against Wu Yuanji in spring 815. Tian Hongzheng sent his son Tian Bu, with a detachment of 3,000 soldiers, to serve in the campaign.

With Emperor Xianzong also having declared the military governor of Chengde Circuit, Wang Chengzong, a renegade—but not declared a campaign against Wang at that point—Tian Hongzheng led his troops to wait on the border with Chengde, and Wang repeatedly harassed his troops. Tian Hongzheng requested permission to enter Chengde territory, and Emperor Xianzong authorized him to advance to Bei Prefecture (貝州, in modern Xingtai). It was also said that it was because of Tian's loyalty to the imperial government that the military governor of Pinglu, Li Shidao, did not dare to openly aid Zhangyi. After Wu was defeated and captured by the imperial general Li Su in 817, Wang became fearful, and he made offers through Tian to submit to the imperial government. Tian relayed Wang's offers to the imperial government, and in spring 818, Emperor Xianzong accepted Wang's offer to send his sons Wang Zhigan (王知感) and Wang Zhixin (王知信) to the capital Chang'an as hostages and to submit two of Chengde's six prefectures to imperial control.

Li Shidao initially also offered to do the same as Wang—sending his sons as hostages and submitting three of Pinglu's 12 prefectures—to show submission to the imperial government, but soon reneged on his offer. In anger, Emperor Xianzong declared a campaign against Pinglu. In the initial stages, Emperor Xianzong, at Pei's suggestion, had the Weibo forces remain at Weibo to rest themselves (and to prevent unnecessary expenditures, as once a circuit's troops left the circuit, the imperial treasury would be responsible for their expenditures) until winter 818, when under imperial orders Weibo forces under Tian Hongzheng crossed the Yellow River and approached Pinglu's capital prefecture Yun Prefecture, causing much alarm at Yun Prefecture. Tian scored several victories against Pinglu forces under the Pinglu officer Liu Wu, in spring 819. Li Shidao, suspecting that Liu was disloyal, sent messengers to Liu's deputy Zhang Xian (張暹) to order Zhang to kill Liu and take over the army. Zhang, instead, informed Liu. Liu responded by commanding his forces to turn back to Yun Prefecture. He captured and executed Li Shidao and his sons, sent their heads to Tian, and submitted to the imperial government. When Emperor Xianzong subsequently commissioned Liu to be the military governor of Yicheng Prefecture (義成, headquartered in modern Anyang, Henan) but feared that Liu would resist the commission and want to hold onto control of Pinglu, he had Tian take precautions by commanding forces from Weibo and several other circuits to move into Yun Prefecture. Liu did not resist and accepted the post at Yicheng. In the aftermaths of the campaign, Tian was given the title of acting Situ (司徒, one of the Three Excellencies) and honorary chancellor with the title Tong Zhongshu Menxia Pingzhangshi (同中書門下平章事). Once Tian arrived at Yun Prefecture, he ended the harsh rule of Li Shidao and his predecessors. Pinglu was subsequently divided into three circuits and given to three different governors. It was at this point historians regarded the reestablishment of Tang's imperial power during Emperor Xianzong's reign reached its apex.

Later in 819, Tian went to Chang'an to pay homage to Emperor Xianzong, and Emperor Xianzong treated him well; he was also given the greater honorary chancellor title of Shizhong (侍中). Tian offered to remain at Chang'an, but Emperor Xianzong declined and returned him to his post at Weibo. As Tian was loyal and was concerned that eventually, his soldiers would demand that his family inherit his position, he sent his brothers, sons, and nephews all to Chang'an, and Emperor Xianzong gave them prominent positions.

== As military governor of Chengde Circuit ==
In spring 820, Emperor Xianzong died and was succeeded by his son Emperor Muzong. In winter 820, after Wang Chengzong died, the Chengde soldiers supported Wang Chengzong's brother Wang Chengyuan as successor, but Wang Chengyuan, while pretending to accept, sent secret submissions to Emperor Muzong declining the position. Emperor Muzong thus carried out a group of military governor movements for Weibo, Chengde, and three other nearby circuits—making Tian Hongzheng the military governor of Chengde, Wang Chengyuan the military governor of Yicheng, Liu Wu the military governor of Zhaoyi Circuit (昭義, headquartered in modern Changzhi, Shanxi), Li Su the military governor of Weibo, and Tian Bu the military governor of Heyang. (Emperor Muzong's making Tian Hongzheng military governor of Chengde was against the advice of the general Yang Yuanqing (楊元慶), who also tried to persuade the chancellors that it was not a good idea, but Yang's suggestions were also ignored by the chancellors.)

As Tian Hongzheng had battled Chengde forces for years, he believed that the Chengde soldiers would bear him great hatred. He thus took 2,000 Weibo soldiers with him to Chengde and kept them with him as his personal guards. He submitted requests to the directorate of finance for the soldiers to be paid out of the imperial treasury. However, the director of finances, Cui Ling (崔倰), a relative of the chancellor Cui Zhi, not understanding the scope of the situation, believed that Chengde soldiers had the responsibilities of protecting their governor and that Weibo soldiers should be returned to Weibo, and that approving Tian's request would create a bad precedent, and thus refused Tian's requests. After Tian made four requests and failed to receive approval, he had to order the Weibo soldiers to return to Weibo.

Meanwhile, Tian Hongzheng was also drawing resentment from the soldiers for another reason. He was known for treating his family well—so much so that his relatives at Chang'an and Luoyang were becoming extremely wasteful. As a result, while at Weibo and later at Chengde, he extracted much revenue from the people and sent them to Chang'an and Luoyang for his family to use. As a result, the soldiers of both circuits resented him for this. Further, at that time, Emperor Muzong had issued an edict that a large cash reward be given to the Chengde soldiers for their submission, but the directorate of finance did not deliver the reward quickly, and the Chengde soldiers became even more resentful. The officer Wang Tingcou, originally of Uyghur extraction but whose great-grandfather had been adopted by Wang Chengzong's grandfather Wang Wujun, planned a mutiny, and often found ways to foster the soldiers' resentment toward Tian. He decided to act as soon as the Weibo soldiers left Chengde.

On the night of August 29, 821, Wang Tingcou gathered his soldiers outside headquarters and charged into the headquarters, slaughtering Tian, his staff, and their families—over 300 people. Subsequently, after an unsuccessful campaign against Wang, Emperor Muzong was forced to commission Wang as the new military governor. He gave Tian Hongzheng the posthumous name of Zhongmin (meaning, "faithful and suffering") and ordered Wang to return Tian's body. However, Wang claimed that Tian's body could not be located by that point.

== Notes and references ==
- Old Book of Tang, vol. 141.
- New Book of Tang, vol. 148.
- Zizhi Tongjian, vols. 238, 239, 240, 241, 242.
