= Tian Ji'an =

General who, as military governor, ruled Weibo Circuit

- Chinese: 田季安
Transcriptions
Standard Mandarin
- Hanyu Pinyin: Tián Jì'ān
- Wade–Giles: T‘ien Chi-an

Other names

Kui (Courtesy name)
- Chinese: 夔
Transcriptions
Standard Mandarin
- Hanyu Pinyin: Kuí
- Wade–Giles: K‘uei

Prince of Yanmen
- Traditional Chinese: 雁門王 鴈門王
- Simplified Chinese: 雁门王
- Literal meaning: King of Wild Goose Pass; Prince of Wild Goose Pass
Transcriptions
Standard Mandarin
- Hanyu Pinyin: Yànménwáng
- Wade–Giles: Yen-mên Wang

Tian Ji'an (781 or 782 (Note: Tian Ji'an's biographies in the Old Book of Tang and New Book of Tang indicated that he was 31 at the time of his death in 812, which would indicate that he was born in 781. However, the same biographies also indicated that he was 14 at the time he succeeded his father Tian Xu in 796, which would make him born in 782.) – September 21, 812), courtesy name Kui and formally the Prince of Yanmen, was a general of the Tang dynasty, who, as military governor (jiedushi), ruled Weibo Circuit (魏博, headquartered in modern Handan, Hebei) in a de facto independent manner from the imperial regime.

== Background ==
Tian Ji'an was born in 781 or 782, during the reign of Emperor Dezong of Tang. At that time, his father Tian Xu was an officer under Tian Xu's cousin Tian Yue, the military governor of Weibo Circuit, who governed the circuit semi-independently from the imperial regime. (Tian Xu's father Tian Chengsi had been the first military governor of Weibo, but chose Tian Yue to be his successor rather than any of his sons.) Tian Ji'an was Tian Xu's third son, and was born of a mother of lowly birth. After Tian Xu assassinated Tian Yue and succeeded him in 784, Emperor Dezong gave Tian Xu his daughter Princess Jiacheng in marriage in 785. As she had no son of her own, she adopted Tian Ji'an as her son. He was thus made the deputy military governor and Tian Xu's designated successor. When Tian Xu died suddenly in 796, the Weibo soldiers supported Tian Ji'an as acting military governor, and Emperor Dezong made him military governor later in the year. Tian Ji'an also inherited Tian Xu's title as Prince of Yanmen.

== As jiedushi ==
In 806, Tian Ji'an was further given the honorary chancellor designation of Tong Zhongshu Menxia Pingzhangshi (同中書門下平章事). It was said that in Tian's youth, his behavior was curbed in by Princess Jiacheng's sternness, and that while he was not capable, he followed the rites and the laws. After Princess Jiacheng died, however, he lost self-control, and he spent his time on polo, hunting, and pleasure.

In 809, after the death of Wang Shizhen the military governor of neighboring Chengde Circuit (成德, headquartered in modern Shijiazhuang, Hebei), Emperor Dezong's grandson Emperor Xianzong, then emperor, was taking a harder line against the circuits acting as semi-independent states, and for months he refused to approve the succession of Wang Shizhen's son Wang Chengzong. Emperor Xianzong finally agreed after Wang Chengzong agreed to allow two of Chengde's prefectures, De (德州, in modern Dezhou, Shandong) and Di (棣州, in modern Binzhou, Shandong) be separated into a different circuit under imperial control, to be named Baoxin Circuit (保信, to be headquartered at De Prefecture). He made Xue Changchao (薛昌朝) the prefect of De Prefecture, whose wife was from the Wang clan, the military governor of the new circuit. However, when Tian received news of this in advance of the news arriving at Chengde, he informed Wang Chengzong that Xue had betrayed him. In response, Wang Chengzong had Xue arrested and refused to submit the two prefectures.

Emperor Xianzong thereafter ordered a campaign against Chengde, and with the main imperial forces—the Shence Army (神策軍), commanded by the eunuch Tutu Chengcui—set to arrive in Weibo's vicinity, Tian was summoning his officers to discuss how to react—fearing that if the imperial forces were successful against Chengde, Weibo would be next. An officer stepped out and advocated a preemptive attack against the Shence Army, and Tian was ready to agree. However, at that time, Tan Zhong (譚忠), an emissary from Liu Ji the military governor of Lulong Circuit (盧龍, headquartered in Beijing), happened to be at Weibo, and he, trying to dissuade Tian from acting against imperial troops, pointing out if Weibo were in fact able to defeat the Shence Army, Emperor Xianzong would surely concentrate his attack on Weibo. Instead, Tan suggested, Weibo should enter into a secret agreement with Chengde whereas Weibo would launch a false attack on Chengde and capture a county to outwardly show Emperor Xianzong that he was not rebelling against imperial authority. Tian agreed with Tan, and in a pre-arranged attack captured Chengde's Tangyang County (堂陽, in modern Xingtai, Hebei).

Meanwhile, it was said that by this point, Tian was cruel. On one occasion, when his secretary Qiu Jiang (丘絳) had a dispute with another staff member of Tian's, Hou Zang (侯臧), Qiu drew Tian's anger, and Tian initially had Qiu demoted to be a county sheriff. He then recalled Qiu but dug a large hole on Qiu's way back, and when Qiu reached the hole, he ordered that Qiu be thrown into the hole and buried alive. Meanwhile, one of his officers, Tian Xing, a distant relative (Tian Xing's father Tian Tingjie (田庭玠) was a cousin of Tian Chengsi's), was favored by the soldiers and often tried to advise him to correct his behavior. Tian Ji'an believed Tian Xing to be a threat and sent him out of the headquarters to serve as the defender of Linqing (臨清, in modern Xingtai). He also considered executing Tian Xing, and Tian Xing, in order to escape death, pretended to suffer paralysis in his limbs. Meanwhile, in 812, Tian Ji'an himself fell ill from a stroke, and his wife Lady Yuan summoned the officers and named his 10-year-old son Tian Huaijian deputy military governor. (Tian Ji'an had at least three other sons, Tian Huaili (田懷禮), Tian Huaixun (田懷詢), and Tian Huairang (田懷讓); it appeared from the Old Book of Tang that Tian Huaijian was the oldest, although the New Book of Tang actually suggested, although did not explicitly state, that Tian Huaijian was the youngest.) Tian Ji'an soon died and was given posthumous honors. With Emperor Xianzong refusing to approve Tian Huaijian's succession, the soldiers supported Tian Xing and overthrew Tian Huaijian in a coup.
