= Xiao Fu =

Chinese Tang dynasty politician (732-788)

Xiao Fu (Chinese: 蕭復; 732 – June 23, 788), courtesy name Lüchu (履初), was a Chinese politician of the Tang dynasty, serving as a chancellor during the reign of Emperor Dezong.

== Background ==
Xiao Fu was born in 732, during the reign of Emperor Xuanzong. He was from a prominent clan that descended from the imperial house of the Liang dynasty, and his grandfather Xiao Song was a chancellor during Emperor Xuanzong's reign. His father was Xiao Song's son Xiao Heng (蕭衡), and his mother was Princess Xinchang, a daughter of Emperor Xuanzong, making him a grandson of Emperor Xuanzong as well. As the Xiao clan was greatly honored, his brothers and cousins all competed having the best clothes, horses, and decorations, while Xiao Fu dressed plainly. He also was often studying in his room, alone, and his friends were all writers or Confucian scholars. His uncle Xiao Hua, who was a chancellor during the reign of Emperor Xuanzong's son Emperor Suzong, was impressed by him, and often stated, "This child will surely glorify this clan." Due to his being the son of a princess, he was, early in his career, made a Gongmenlang (宮門郎), in charge of the office of the palace gates (宮門局, Gongmenju). He was later made the director of transportation for the crown prince (太子僕, Taizi Pu).

== During Emperor Daizong's reign ==
During the Guangde era (763–764) of Emperor Suzong's son Emperor Daizong, there was a span of poor harvests, causing food prices to rise. With the Xiao clan being a large one and needing funds to pay for food, the clan considered selling an ancestral property in Zhaoying County (昭應, near the capital Chang'an). The chancellor Wang Jin heard that the property contained beautiful trees and springs and wanted the property, and thus sent his brother Wang Hong (王紘) to meet Xiao Fu. Wang Hong stated to Xiao, "You, sir, have talent that shall land you greater offices. If you offer your manor to my brother, he will surely help you achieve that." Xiao Fu responded, "I, an imperial servant, am selling this ancestral property because of poverty, to aid the widows and young of the clan. If I trade it for a high position such that I let my clan folks be frozen or starved, I would not be doing what even a commoner should be doing." Wang Jin was angered by these remarks and removed Xiao from his office, and he spent the next several years at home. Despite this, he was not distressed. He later returned to government service and became a low-level official at the executive bureau of government (尚書省, Shangshu Sheng). Yet later, he served as the prefect of Chang Prefecture (常州, in modern Changzhou, Jiangsu).

== During Emperor Dezong's reign ==
=== Prior to chancellorship ===
In 779, during the reign of Emperor Daizong's son Emperor Dezong, Xiao Fu was made the governor (觀察使, Guanchashi) of Hunan Circuit (湖南, headquartered in modern Changsha, Hunan) as well as the prefect of Hunan's capital Tan Prefecture (in modern Changsha, Hunan). He later served as the prefect of Tong Prefecture (同州, in modern Weinan, Shaanxi). At that time, there was a famine in the prefecture, and he opened the food storages that were overseen by the governor of Jingzhao Circuit (京兆, i.e., the Chang'an region) to give to the people, without approval from his superiors. As a result, he was punished by being reduced in rank. When his friends visited him to console him, he remarked, "I benefited others. Is it not right I suffer a minor punishment?" He was soon made the deputy minister of defense (兵部侍郎, Bingbu Shilang).

In 783, with Li Xilie the military governor (jiedushi) of Huaixi Circuit (淮西, headquartered in modern Zhumadian, Henan) rebelling against imperial rule, Emperor Dezong, believing that the armies sent against Li Xilie needed a supreme commander to coordinate their actions, commissioned his son Li Yi (李誼) the Prince of Pu to be the supreme commander of the forces against Huaixi, and he gave Xiao the honorary title of minister of census (戶部尚書, Hubu Shangshu), to serve as the secretary general for Li Yi.

However, before Li Yi could depart Chang'an, soldiers from Jingyuan Circuit (涇原, headquartered in modern Pingliang, Gansu), at Chang'an to await deployment to the east against Li Xilie or other warlords, mutinied after they were not awarded as they believed they deserved. Emperor Dezong fled to Fengtian (奉天, in modern Xianyang, Shaanxi). Many officials followed him there, including Xiao. The Jingyuan soldiers supported the general Zhu Ci as their leader, and Zhu initially claimed that he was set to welcome Emperor Dezong back to Chang'an, but soon was planning to take over as emperor. Meanwhile, Emperor Dezong, finding Fengtian to be too small of a city for him and his followers, wanted to head for Fengxiang (鳳翔, in modern Baoji, Shaanxi), then governed by the former chancellor Zhang Yi but formerly under Zhu's control. When Xiao heard that Emperor Dezong was intended to head to Fengxiang, he immediately met with Emperor Dezong and warned against it:

Your Imperial Majesty is making a big mistake. The soldiers at Fengxiang were all formerly under Zhu Ci's command, and there will surely be many who are conspiring with him. I even worry that Zhang Yi will not be able to stand long. How can the imperial train put itself into such great danger?

Emperor Dezong responded that he had already decided to head to Fengxiang, but on Xiao's objection will remain at Fengtian for one more day. The next day, news arrived that Zhu's former subordinate Li Chulin (李楚琳) had mutinied, killed Zhang, and taken over Fengxiang. Soon thereafter, Xiao, was made the minister of civil service affairs (吏部尚書, Libu Shangshu) and given the designation Tong Zhongshu Menxia Pingzhangshi (同中書門下平章事), making him a chancellor de facto, along with Liu Congyi and Jiang Gongfu.

=== During chancellorship ===
Zhu Ci, who claimed the title of emperor of his new state of Qin, was soon putting Fengtian under siege, although Fengtian was saved by the major Tang general Li Huaiguang. Meanwhile, Xiao earnestly sought reform of Emperor Dezong's administration at Fengtian. He suggested that Emperor Dezong not give eunuchs authorities and recall the eunuchs who were serving as army monitors—a suggestion that greatly displeased Emperor Dezong. Despite Emperor Dezong's displeasure, Xiao responded:

When Your Imperial Majesty first became emperor, your holy virtues were known throughout the realm. However, after Yang Yan and Lu Qi became chancellors, the governance was disrupted such that we are in the state we are in. If Your Imperial Majesty can change your mind, I will serve the hardest I can. If you want me to be submissive for my own safety, I cannot do that.

On one occasion, when Xiao and Lu met Emperor Dezong together, Lu was merely flattering Emperor Dezong and following everything that Emperor Dezong said, and Xiao stated, "Lu Qi's words are wrongful." This surprised Emperor Dezong, and after the meeting was over, he told his attendants, "Xiao Fu views me lightly." In spring 784, while he was still at Fengtian, he commissioned Xiao Fu to be the examiner of the southern circuits of the empire and sent him out on a mission to survey those circuits, in order to get Xiao away from him. When Liu Congyi and many other officials asked that Xiao be kept at the imperial government, Emperor Dezong's suspicions were further aroused that Xiao had induced these other officials into speaking on his behalf, although he did not investigate the matter further.

By late 784, the general Li Sheng had destroyed Zhu's regime, allowing Emperor Dezong to return to Chang'an. Xiao had also returned from his mission, and he suggested to Emperor Dezong that Chen Shaoyou (陳少遊), the military governor of Huainan Circuit (淮南, headquartered in modern Yangzhou, Jiangsu), who had submitted to Li Xilie during the time Emperor Dezong was away from Chang'an, be replaced by Wei Gao—a Fengxiang officer who had resisted Li Chulin. Emperor Dezong agreed. However, Xiao was soon surprised when Liu Congyi stated to him, "Ma Qinxu [(馬欽緒, an eunuch who served as imperial messenger)] informed me that the Emperor wanted me to discuss with you, Lord, your proposal, and then carry it out without informing Li Mian and Lu Han [(two other chancellors who served with Xiao and Liu)]. Can you tell me what your proposal was?" Xiao, finding it inappropriate that Emperor Dezong was keeping secrets away from Li Mian and Lu, as fellow chancellors, stated:

When Emperor Yao and Emperor Shun [(mythical emperors who governed their states in great harmony)] promoted or demoted an official, their officials and the people all agreed. If Li and Lu should not be chancellors, then they should be removed. If they are to be chancellors, how can such important matters be hidden from them and not discussed with them? This is a great problem with the imperial governance. This morning, the Emperor already told me this, and I told him that this is inappropriate, and I am surprised that he is nevertheless doing this. It is not that I would not be willing to coauthor a petition with you, but I am afraid that this would become precedent. Therefore, I do not dare to inform you what my proposal is.

When Liu informed Emperor Dezong about this, Emperor Dezong was displeased. Xiao, seeing that he had lost the emperor's favor, offered to resign. In winter 784, Emperor Dezong removed him from his chancellor position and made him a member of the staff of the Crown Prince Li Song.

=== After chancellorship ===
In 787, a scandal involving Princess Gao—the daughter of Emperor Suzong (and thus aunt to Emperor Dezong) and the widow of Xiao Fu's cousin Xiao Sheng (蕭升), whose daughter was the wife and crown prince to Li Song—unfolded, as she was found to have had a large number of young lovers, and she was further accused of using witchcraft. The scandal nearly caused Li Song to be removed from his crown prince position and forced him to divorce Crown Princess Xiao, and the scandal also enveloped the Xiao household. Emperor Dezong, still resentful of Xiao Fu, let him keep his rank but exiled him to Rao Prefecture (饒州, in modern Shangrao, Jiangxi). It was said, though, that Xiao was not distressed and made no complaints. He died in 788, while still at Rao Prefecture. His grandson Xiao Zhi later served as a chancellor during the reign of Emperor Yizong.

== Notes and references ==
- Old Book of Tang, vol. 125.
- New Book of Tang, vol. 101.
- Zizhi Tongjian, vols. 228, 229, 231.
