= Qiao Lin =

Qiao Lin (喬琳) (died July 28, 784) was an official of the Chinese Tang dynasty, serving as a chancellor briefly early in the reign of Emperor Dezong. He later served the rebel ruler Zhu Ci, and after Tang forces destroyed Zhu's regime, was executed despite his old age.

== Background and early career ==
It is not known which year Qiao Lin was born, but it is known that his family was from Taiyuan. He was poor in his youth and lost his father early but was studious and became known for his literary abilities. Early in Emperor Xuanzong's Tianbao era (742–756), he passed the imperial examinations and was made the sheriff of Chengwu County (成武, in modern Heze, Shandong) and later the sheriff of Xingping County (興平, in modern Xianyang, Shaanxi). He was later invited by the great general Guo Ziyi to serve as Guo's secretary, and later made a Jiancha Yushi (監察御史), a mid-level imperial censor. At this time, he was said to be often talkative and jocular, and he often insulted his colleagues. As a result, his relationship with a colleague, Bi Yao (畢耀), which started with mutual jocular insults, evolved into frequent serious disputes such that they accused each other of faults. Qiao was demoted to be a census officer at Ba Prefecture (巴州, in modern Bazhong, Sichuan).

Qiao later served as the magistrate of Nanguo County (南郭, in modern Nanchong, Sichuan), and later the military chief of staff under Zhang Xiancheng (張獻誠) the military governor of Shannan West Circuit (山南西道, headquartered in modern Hanzhong, Shaanxi). After Zhang completed his term of office, Qiao became an assistant to Xianyu Shuming (鮮于叔明) the military governor of Dongchuan Circuit (東川, headquartered in modern Mianyang, Sichuan). He then successively served as the prefect of Guo Prefecture (果州, in modern Nanchong), Mian Prefecture (綿州, in modern Mianyang, Sichuan), and Sui Prefecture (遂州, in modern Suining, Sichuan). He was subsequently recalled to the capital Chang'an to serve as the deputy chief judge of the supreme court (大理少卿, Dali Shaoqing) and then the principal of the imperial university (國子祭酒, Guozi Jijiu). Yet later, he was made the prefect of Huai Prefecture (懷州, in modern Jiaozuo, Henan).

== During Emperor Dezong's reign ==
After Emperor Xuanzong's great-grandson Emperor Dezong became emperor in 779, Emperor Dezong's teacher Zhang She (張涉) became an influential advisor for Emperor Dezong. Qiao was friendly with Zhang, and when Emperor Dezong asked Zhang for a recommendation for a chancellor, Zhang recommended Qiao — despite the fact that Qiao was not known for his abilities. In fall 779, Emperor Dezong, believing in Zhang's recommendations, made Qiao chief imperial censor (御史大夫, Yushi Daifu) and gave him the designation Tong Zhongshu Menxia Pingzhangshi (同中書門下平章事), making him a chancellor de facto — a commission that much shocked the people. By this point, however, Qiao was old and hard of hearing, and whenever Emperor Dezong consulted him, he would rarely respond properly. After he had only served less than 90 days as a chancellor, Emperor Dezong removed him from his chancellor position and made him the minister of public works (工部尚書, Gongbu Shangshu). As a result of this inappropriate recommendation, Emperor Dezong distanced himself from Zhang thereafter. In 780, Emperor Dezong made Qiao the assistant to his younger brother Li Shu (李述) the Prince of Mu in a nationwide search for his mother Empress Dowager Shen, who had disappeared during the Anshi Rebellion. (Empress Dowager Shen was ultimately never located.)

In 783, the soldiers from Jingyuan Circuit (涇原, headquartered in modern Pingliang, Gansu), at Chang'an to await deployment to the east in Emperor Dezong's campaigns against warlords, mutinied when they were angry that Emperor Dezong did not give them sufficient rewards. Emperor Dezong fled to Fengtian (奉天, in modern Xianyang), and Qiao followed him there. The mutineers supported the general Zhu Ci as their leader, and Zhu soon declared himself the emperor of a new state of Qin. Qin forces, however, were not able to capture Emperor Dezong at Fengtian, and the Tang and Qin forces went into a stalemate. In spring 784, the major Tang general Li Huaiguang, angry with Emperor Dezong over Emperor Dezong's refusal to meet him, entered into an alliance with Zhu against Emperor Dezong, and Emperor Dezong was forced to further flee to Liang Prefecture (梁州, in modern Hanzhong). Qiao initially followed him but, when they reached Zhouzhi (盩厔, in modern Xi'an, Shaanxi), Qiao, citing his old age and his lack of a horse, declined to follow Emperor Dezong — despite Emperor Dezong's offering an imperial horse to him. Emperor Dezong, saddened, stated, "Take care of yourself. I will bid farewell to you, Lord." Qiao thereafter took tonsure and became a Buddhist monk at Xiaoyou Temple (仙遊寺). When Zhu heard this, he had soldiers escort Qiao back to the capital and offered him the post of minister of civil service affairs (吏部尚書, Libu Shangshu). Qiao, after initially declining, accepted. He appeared to have mixed emotions about this, however, and one of the prospective officials that he selected for Zhu complained that the position given him was not secure, Qiao's response was an ambiguous, "Do you really feel that this position can be secure?"

Later in the year, though, another major Tang general, Li Sheng, destroyed Zhu's regime (which had been renamed Han) and recaptured Chang'an. He welcomed Emperor Dezong back to Chang'an. A group of Han officials, including Qiao, were set to be executed. Li Sheng, taking pity on Qiao because of his old age, sought forgiveness on Qiao's behalf. Emperor Dezong, resenting Qiao for turning against him, refused, and ordered Qiao beheaded. On July 28, 784 (the seventh day of the seventh month of the lunar calendar), Qiao was executed along with two other major Han officials, Jiang Zhen (蔣鎮) and Zhang Guangsheng (張光晟). Before he was killed, he sighed and commented, "I, Qiao Lin, was born on the seventh day of the seventh month, and I die here on the seventh day of the seventh month. Is it not my fate?"

== Notes and references ==
- Old Book of Tang, vol. 127.
- New Book of Tang, vol. 224, part 2.
- Zizhi Tongjian, vols. vol. 226, 230, 231.
