= Lu Han (Tang dynasty) =

Lu Han (Chinese: 盧翰) was a Chinese politician during the Tang dynasty, serving as a chancellor during the reign of Emperor Dezong.

== Background ==
Very little is known about Lu Han's background, and his date of birth is not known, as, contrary to the case with most other Tang chancellors, there was no biography of him in either the Old Book of Tang or the New Book of Tang. He was from the "second house of northern ancestry" (北祖第二房) of the prominent Lu clan of Fanyang, although Lu Han's male line ancestors for several generations prior to his grandfather Lu Lübing (盧履冰), during the Tang dynasty, had not served as governmental officials. Lu Lübing served as a low-level official at the legislative bureau of government (中書省, Zhongshu Sheng), while Lu Han's father Lu Zhengji (盧正己) served as a minister of justice.

== As chancellor ==
In 784, while Emperor Dezong was at Fengtian (奉天, in modern Xianyang, Shaanxi) because the capital Chang'an was occupied by the rebel Zhu Ci's state of Han, Lu Han, who was then deputy minister of civil service affairs (吏部侍郎, Libu Shilang), was made the deputy minister of defense (兵部侍郎, Bingbu Shilang) and given the designation Tong Zhongshu Menxia Pingzhangshi (同中書門下平章事), making him a chancellor de facto. Few of his acts were recorded in history. In 784, when fellow chancellor Xiao Fu suggested that Chen Shaoyou (陳少遊) the military governor (Jiedushi) of Huainan Circuit (淮南, headquartered in modern Yangzhou, Jiangsu) be replaced with Wei Gao, Emperor Dezong ordered Xiao to only discuss the matter with another chancellor, Liu Congyi, excluding Lu and Li Mian from the discussion, and Xiao's refusal to do so eventually led to Xiao's resignation. Around the new year 785, Lu was given the additional title as overseer of Taiwei Palace (太微宮). In spring 785, Lu and Liu were recorded as not having dared to oppose the promotion of former chancellor Lu Qi, whom the popular sentiment had blamed for the rebellions of Zhu and Li Huaiguang. In 786, Lu Han was removed from his chancellor post and made an advisor to Emperor Dezong's crown prince Li Song. That was the last historical record regarding Lu in history, and it is not known when he died.

== Notes and references ==
- Zizhi Tongjian, vols. 229, 231.
