= Li Mian =

Chinese judge, military general, musician, poet and politician

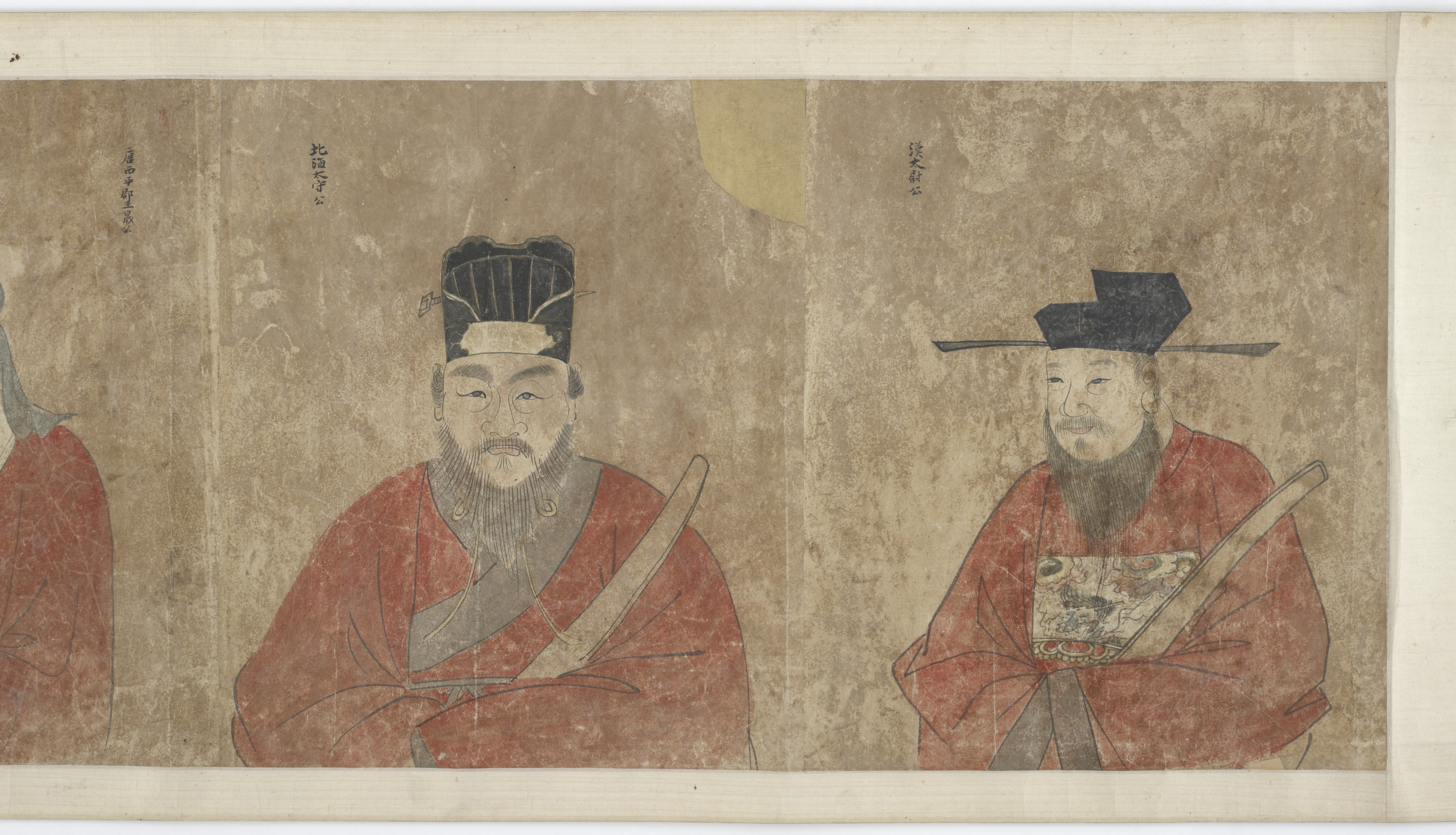
- Children: Li Zuan, Li Zhen, Li Wei, Li Yue
- Parent(s): Li Zeyan

Li Mian (Chinese: 李勉; 717 – September 14, 788), courtesy name Xuanqing (玄卿), formally Duke Zhenjian of Qian (汧貞簡公), was a Chinese judge, military general, musician, poet, and politician during the Tang dynasty, serving as a chancellor during the reign of Emperor Dezong.

== Background ==
Li Mian was born in 717, during the reign of Emperor Xuanzong. He was a member of the Tang dynasty's imperial Li clan, being a great-grandson of Li Yuanyi (李元懿) the Prince of Zheng, a son of Tang's founding emperor Emperor Gaozu. His father Li Zeyan (李擇言) was a son of Li Yuanyi's son Li Xuan (李璿) the Duke of Nanhai, but as Li Xuan's brother Li Lin (李琳) the Duke of Ande was sonless, Li Lin adopted Li Zeyan, who thus inherited the title of Duke of Ande. Li Zeyan successively served as a prefect of four prefectures, and while serving under the important official Zhang Jiazhen, who was otherwise arrogant and condescending toward his subordinates, was particularly respected by Zhang.

Li Mian himself was said to be studious in the Confucian classics and histories in his youth, and after he grew, was said to be quiet, elegant, honest, and strict. He also was well-learned in mysticism. As he was a close relative to the imperial line, he was eventually made the magistrate of Kaifeng County. At that time, Kaifeng, the capital of Bian Prefecture (汴州), was a key transportation point for both water and land transport, and the population was highly diverse and difficult to govern. Both Li Mian and his colleague from a nearby county, Lu Chenggui (盧成軌), were both known for their abilities to capture criminals and maintain order.

== During Emperor Suzong's reign ==
In 755, the general An Lushan rebelled at Fanyang, and by summer 756, the forces of his new state of Yan were approaching the Tang capital Chang'an, forcing Emperor Xuanzong to flee to Chengdu. Emperor Xuanzong's son and crown prince Li Heng, however, did not follow him to Chengdu, but fled to Lingwu instead, where he was declared emperor (as Emperor Suzong). Li Mian followed Emperor Suzong to Lingwu, and was made Jiancha Yushi (監察御史), an imperial censor. At that time, everything at Emperor Suzong's court, including his palace, was makeshift, and the officers lacked discipline. On one occasion, the officer Guan Chongsi (管崇嗣) was sitting with his back to the palace, considered a disrespectful posture. Li Mian submitted an indictment against Guan, and Emperor Suzong, while pardoning Guan for his indiscretion, stated, "It is because I have Li Mian that the court even has any discipline." In 757, after Tang forces recaptured Chang'an and were attacking east and seeking to recapture the eastern capital Luoyang, which had become the Yan capital, there was an occasion when over 100 Yan captives were delivered to Chang'an, to be executed on Emperor Suzong's orders. Li Mian submitted a petition stating:

Currently, the greatest evil has not been wiped out yet, and over half of the realm had been tainted by the bandits. They have heard that Your Imperial Majesty has risen like a dragon, and they all want to change their hearts to receive your holy grace. If we execute them all, we will be driving people into the ranks of the bandits.

Emperor Suzong thus pardoned the captives.

Subsequently, after Tang forces recaptured Luoyang, Li Mian served as the deputy mayor of Henan Municipality (河南, i.e., the Luoyang region), and later successively served as military commander under the generals Wang Sili (王思禮) and Li Guozhen (李國貞). He later became the commandant at Liang Prefecture (梁州, in modern Hanzhong, Shaanxi) and governor (觀察使, Guanchashi) of Shannan West Circuit (山南西道, headquartered in modern Hanzhong). On one occasion, when Wang Zui (王晬), a capable junior official that he had made the magistrate of Liang Prefecture's seat Nanzheng County (南鄭), was falsely accused by powerful men at court and ordered executed by Emperor Suzong's edict, Li Mian, instead of following the edict, detained Wang but stopped the execution, and immediately submitted a petition defending Wang. Wang was subsequently spared. However, as a result, in 762, Li Mian was recalled to Chang'an to serve as Dali Shaoqing (大理少卿), the deputy chief judge of the supreme court (大理寺, Dali Si). Once Li Mian was at Chang'an, he met Emperor Suzong to proclaim Wang's innocence and list Wang's accomplishments. Emperor Suzong approved of him and made him the deputy minister of worship (太常卿, Taichang Qing). Emperor Suzong wanted to promote him further, but as Li Mian would not be submissive to the powerful eunuch Li Fuguo, and so Li Mian was sent out of the capital to serve as the prefect of Fen Prefecture (汾州, in modern Linfen, Shanxi).

== During Emperor Daizong's reign ==
Emperor Suzong died later in 762 and was succeeded by his son Emperor Daizong. During Emperor Daizong's reign, Li Mian successively served as the prefect of Guo Prefecture (虢州, in modern Sanmenxia, Henan), the mayor of Jingzhao Municipality (京兆, i.e., the Chang'an region), and the mayor of Henan Municipality. Subsequently, he served as deputy chief imperial censor (御史中丞, Yushi Zhongcheng), and then the governor of Jiangxi Circuit (江西, headquartered in modern Nanchang, Jiangxi). While serving at Jiangxi Circuit, he had to combat several rebellions and was able to suppress them with help from other circuits. On one occasion, when the father of one of his subordinates was ill, the subordinate used witchcraft to try to cure his father, and the witchcraft including making a doll with Li Mian's name on it and burying it. When the doll was found, Li Mian stated, "He was doing this for his father's cure, and this can be forgiven."

In 767, Li Mian was in Chang'an to pay homage to Emperor Daizong, and was made the mayor of Jingzhao as well as the chief imperial censor (御史大夫, Yushi Daifu). He was said to be simple and solemn in his governance. At that time, the powerful eunuch Yu Chao'en was the monitor of the armies as well as acting principal of the imperial university (國子監, Guozi Jian). Due to the authority he had, he was arrogant and demanded respect. Li Mian's predecessors as mayor all, when Yu visited the university, held feasts with food sufficient for several hundred people. When Yu visited the university on Li Mian's watch, however, Li Mian refused — pointing out that as the principal, Yu was the host when he visited the university, and that if he were ever to visit the Jingzhao municipal government, he would surely hold a feast in Yu's honor. When Yu heard this, he resented Li Mian and did not visit the university. Soon, Li Mian was removed.

In 769, Li Mian was made the military governor of Lingnan Circuit (嶺南, headquartered in modern Guangzhou, Guangdong), as well as the prefect of Lingnan's capital Guang Prefecture (廣州). At that time, two rebels, Feng Chongdao (馮崇道) and Zhu JIshi (朱濟時), had been holding more than 10 prefectures. After Li Mian's arrival, he supported his subordinates Li Guan (李觀) and Wang Hong (王翃) in suppressing the rebels, and was able to calm the circuit by 771. It was said that because Li Mian was honest in his governance of the circuit, previously, only four or five foreign merchant ships would arrive in Guang Prefecture per year, but toward the end of his term, because Li Mian did not demand bribes, more than 40 foreign merchant ships would arrive each year. Later, when he was recalled to Chang'an, on the journey back, as he was going through Shimen (石門, in modern Changde, Hunan), he threw treasures that his family members had collected into the Yangtze River to show that he did not treasure them. This led popular opinion at the time to compare him to such honest officials of the past such as Song Jing, Lu Huan (盧奐), and Li Chaoyin (李朝隱). The people and officials of Guang Prefecture requested Emperor Daizong's permission to build a monument in Li Mian's honor, and Emperor Daizong agreed. In 775, Emperor Daizong made him the minister of public works (工部尚書, Gongbu Shangshu) and created him the Duke of Qian. In 773, when Linghu Zhang (令狐彰) the military governor of Yongping Circuit (永平, headquartered in modern Anyang, Henan) was near death, Linghu recommended Emperor Daizong to replace him with either Li Mian or Liu Yan, and Emperor Daizong made Li Mian the military governor of Yongping to replace Linghu.

In 776, Tian Shenyu (田神玉) the acting military governor of Biansong Circuit (汴宋, headquartered in modern Kaifeng, Henan), died. Tian's subordinate Li Lingyao (李靈曜) killed Tian's son and took over the circuit. Emperor Daizong initially reacted by making Li Mian the acting military governor of Biansong and commissioning Li Lingyao as the prefect of Pu Prefecture (濮州, in modern Heze, Shandong). When Li Lingyao refused, Emperor Daizong gave in and made him the acting military governor of Biansong, but when Li Lingyao subsequently refused to follow imperial orders, Emperor Daizong commissioned governors of the surrounding circuits — Li Mian, Li Zhongchen, Ma Sui, Chen Shaoyou (陳少遊), and Li Zhengji — to attack Li Lingyao. Later that year, with Li Zhongchen and Ma directly attacking Biansong's capital Bian Prefecture, they defeated Li Lingyao and forced him to flee. Li Lingyao was captured in flight by Li Mian's subordinate Du Rujiang (杜如江), and Li Mian had Li Lingyao delivered to Chang'an to be executed. Initially, the western half of Biansong was merged into Li Zhongchen's Huaixi Circuit (淮西, headquartered in modern Zhumadian, Henan), but after Li Zhongchen's subordinate Li Xilie mutinied and expelled him in 779, Emperor Dezong, while allowing Li Xilie to take over Huaixi, stripped Bian and Ying (潁州, in modern Fuyang, Anhui) Prefectures from Huaixi and added them to Yongping. He also had Li Mian move Yongping's headquarters to Bian Prefecture.

== During Emperor Dezong's reign ==
=== As military governor of Yongping Circuit ===
Later in 779, Emperor Daizong died and was succeeded by his son Emperor Dezong. Emperor Dezong made Li Mian an honorary chancellor with the designation Tong Zhongshu Menxia Pingzhangshi (同中書門下平章事).

Emperor Dezong soon took a harder line against the military governors of several circuits which were effectively governed independently from the imperial government — Li Zhengji's Pinglu Circuit (平盧, headquartered in modern Tai'an, Shandong), Li Baochen's Chengde Circuit (成德, headquartered in modern Shijiazhuang, Hebei), Tian Yue's Weibo Circuit (魏博, headquartered in modern Handan, Hebei), and Liang Chongyi's Shannan East Circuit (山南東道, headquartered in modern Xiangfan, Hubei). After Li Baochen and Li Zhengji both died in 781, he refused to let their respective sons, Li Weiyue and Li Na, inherit their fathers' positions, and those semi-independent circuits mobilized to prepare for war against the imperial government. As part of the preparation for war, Emperor Dezong divided Yongping, making three of its seven prefectures — Song (宋州, in modern Shangqiu, Henan), Bo (亳州, in modern Bozhou, Anhui), and Ying Prefectures — into a new Xuanwu Circuit, giving Si Prefecture (泗州, in modern Huai'an, Jiangsu) to Huainan Circuit (淮南, headquartered in modern Yangzhou, Jiangsu), and adding Zheng Prefecture (鄭州, in modern Zhengzhou, Henan) to Yongping. He also made Li Mian the overall commander of the forces not only of his own circuit, but also of Xuanwu and Heyang (河陽, headquartered in modern Luoyang) Circuits. When Liu Qia (劉洽) the military governor of Xuanwu Circuit was subsequently able to put LI Na under siege at Pu Prefecture, Li Mian persuaded Li Na to offer to submit to imperial authority, but Emperor Dezong, convinced of victory at that point, refused to accept Li Na's surrender. Subsequently, Li Na was able to regroup and continue to resist the imperial government. When Emperor Dezong subsequently ordered Li Xilie to attack Li Na, Li Xilie, who was secretly aligned with Li Na, pretended to be ready to attack Pinglu through Yongping, and he requested Li Mian to permit him passage, while he was preparing to launch a surprise attack on Yongping instead. Li Mian prepared to welcome Li Xilie through his circuit but mobilized his own troops to prepare for an attack. Li Xilie, realizing that Li Mian was taking precautions, did not attack Yongping at this point.

By 783, when Li Xilie was openly defying the imperial government, the chancellor Lu Qi, resentful of the senior official Yan Zhenqing, suggested Emperor Dezong to send Yan to Huaixi to try to persuade Li Xilie to resubmit. Li Mian, seeking that Yan's mission would be fruitless and that he was heading for certain death, submitted an objection and tried to intercept Yan on the way, but was unable to do so. Yan was subsequently detained by Li Xilie, although Li Xilie's subordinates Zhou Zeng (周曾), Wang Bin (王玢), and Yao Dan (姚憺) were in secret communications with Li Mian and hoping to replace Li Xilie and replace him with Yan. Soon, their plot was discovered, however, and Li Xilie killed them. Subsequently, when the imperial general Emperor Dezong sent to attack Li Xilie, Geshu Yao (哥舒曜), was put under siege by LI Xilie at Xiangcheng (襄城, in modern Xuchang, Henan), Emperor Dezong ordered Li Mian and Liu Dexin (劉德信) to aid Geshu. Li Mian, believing that since Li Xilie was attacking Xiangcheng, Xu Prefecture (許州, in modern Xuchang) would be easy to capture, and once Xu Prefecture fell, Li Xilie would be forced to lift the siege on Xiangcheng. He therefore ordered Liu and Tang Hanchen (唐漢臣) to attack Xu Prefecture. Before Liu and Tang could reach Xu Prefecture, however, Emperor Dezong sent an edict ordering them to stop. Liu and Tang were surprised and dismayed, and they withdrew, and they became careless in their retreat. They were ambushed by Li Xilie's officer Li Kecheng (李克誠), and suffered massive losses. With Li Mian fearful that Luoyang would be under attack, he sent an army under Li Jian (李堅) with 4,000 men to Luoyang to aid it, but subsequently, with the return path cut off by Li Xilie, they were unable to return to Bian Prefecture. From that point on, Yongping itself was in a precarious position, unable to aid Geshu and finding it difficult to stand against Li Xilie.

By late 783, Li Xilie was putting Bian Prefecture under siege. Li Mian held the city against the siege for more than a month, but with no aid forces arriving, he abandoned Bian Prefecture and took over 10,000 people to flee to Xuanwu's capital Song Prefecture. Li Mian submitted a petition to Emperor Dezong — who was at Fengtian (奉天, in modern Xianyang, Shaanxi) at the time due to rebellion by Zhu Ci, who had seized Chang'an and declared himself the emperor of a new state of Qin — requesting punishment. Emperor Dezong responded, "I was unable to defend the imperial ancestral temples. Li Mian needs not be insecure." Li Mian subsequently transferred his troops to Liu Qia. By fall 784, with Li Mian repeatedly requesting punishment, Emperor Dezong removed him from the overall command of the three circuits and the military governorship of Yongping, but recalled him to Chang'an (which had been recaptured by that point) to serve as chancellor as well as acting Situ (司徒, one of the Three Excellencies). When Li Mian arrived at Chang'an, many officials commented, "Li Mian lost Daliang [(大梁, another name for Bian Prefecture)] and should not remain as chancellor." Emperor Dezong's trusted senior advisor Li Mi pointed out that while Li Mian was not a capable general, he was a capable governor that the people loved and respected, and that he, by transferring the command to Liu, contributed to Liu's subsequent victory. Emperor Dezong agreed with Li Mi and allowed Li Mian to exercise his authority as chancellor.

=== Chancellorship and after chancellorship ===
Li Mian, while he was then in the chancellor's office, did not dare to exert his authority, and he often simply yielded to the other chancellors. In 784, when fellow chancellor Xiao Fu suggested that Chen Shaoyou be replaced as military governor of Huainan Circuit with Wei Gao, Emperor Dezong ordered Xiao to only discuss the matter with another chancellor, Liu Congyi, excluding Li Mian and Lu Han from the discussion, and Xiao's refusal to do so eventually led to Xiao's resignation. In 785, when Emperor Dezong, over the objections of the officials Yuan Gao (袁高), Chen Jing (陳京), and Zhao Xu (趙需), was set to promote Lu Qi, who had been demoted to be a prefectural military advisor and exiled because he was blamed for the rebellions of Zhu Ci and Li Huaiguang, to be prefect, Li Mian backed Yuan and his colleagues. When Emperor Dezong asked the chancellors, "Is it all right to make Lu Qi the prefect of a small prefecture?" Li Mian responded, "If Your Imperial Majesty really want to use him, even a large prefecture is all right. But you should consider how disappointed the realm would be." Further, when Emperor Dezong asked Li Mian, "Everyone accuses Lu Qi of treacherousness, but I do not see it. Do you, Lord, see it?" Li Mian responded, "Everyone under heaven knows that he is treacherous, but Your Imperial Majesty does not. This is, indeed, proof of his treacherousness." This caused Li Mian to be further admired for his honesty, but also because of such bluntness, Emperor Dezong distanced himself from Li Mian.

In 786, when Emperor Dezong reorganized his government and put the six ministries of the executive bureau of government (尚書省, Shangshu Sheng) directly under the chancellors, Li Mian was given control of the ministry of justice (刑部, Xingbu). Subsequently, with Li Mian repeatedly offering to resign, he was removed from his chancellor post and made a senior advisor to Emperor Dezong's crown prince Li Song. Li Mian died later in 786 and was buried with great honors.

Li Mian was known for his abilities in guqin and poetry, and he wrote a number of musical pieces. It was said that during his time in high positions, for more than 20 years, he distributed his salaries to his relatives and subordinates, leaving little for himself, such that when he died, there were no savings, and that despite his honored status, he was constantly humble in dealing with subordinates. He had invited two famed individuals, Li Xun (李巡) and Zhang Can (張參), as secretaries, and after both Li Xun and Zhang died while serving him, for three years, during feasts, he would have places set for them at the table and offered meals and wine to their spirits.

== Notes and references ==
- Old Book of Tang, vol. 131.
- New Book of Tang, vol. 131.
- Zizhi Tongjian, vols. 218, 220, 222, 224, 225, 226, 227, 228, 229, 231, 232.
