= Liu Congyi =

Tang dynasty chancellor

Liu Congyi (Chinese: 劉從一; 742 – November 4, 785), posthumous name Jing (敬), was a Chinese historian and politician of the Tang dynasty, serving as a chancellor during the reign of Emperor Dezong.

== Background ==
Liu Congyi was born in 742, during the reign of Emperor Xuanzong. He came from a line of officials of the Tang dynasty, starting with his great-great-grandfather Liu Linfu (劉林甫). His great-granduncle Liu Xiangdao served as a chancellor during the reign of Emperor Gaozong, and Liu Xiangdao's son Liu Jingxian served as a chancellor late in the reign of Emperor Gaozong as well as the regency of Emperor Gaozong's wife Empress Dowager Wu (later known as Wu Zetian) over their sons Emperor Zhongzong and Emperor Ruizong. Liu Congyi's grandfather Liu Lingzhi (劉令植) served as a deputy minister, while his father Liu Ruzhi (劉孺之) served as the deputy mayor of Jingzhao Municipality (京兆), which included the Tang capital Chang'an.

== During Emperor Daizong's reign ==
Liu Congyi himself passed the imperial examinations when he was young, and during the Dali era (766–779) of Emperor Xuanzong's grandson Emperor Daizong, he passed a special examination for those who could write in a grand style. He was thereafter made Xiaoshulang (校書郎), an editor at the Palace Library. He subsequently served as the sheriff of Weinan County (渭南, in modern Weinan, Shaanxi). Because his behavior was elegant, he was respected by the official Chang Gun, and after Chang became chancellor in 777, he made Liu Jiancha Yushi (監察御史), an imperial censor. Later, though, when Liu's mother died, he left governmental service to observe a period of mourning for her.

== During Emperor Dezong's reign ==
When Liu Congyi's mourning period was complete, the emperor was Emperor Daizong's son Emperor Dezong, and the most powerful chancellor was Lu Qi. Lu recommended Liu, and Liu returned to the bureau of censors as Shiyushi (侍御史). After several months, because a relative of his was also becoming an imperial censor, under Tang regulations that relatives should not serve at the same agency, he was made Xingbu Yuanwailang (刑部員外郎), a low-level official at the ministry of justice (刑部, Xingbu). In 783, with Li Xilie the military governor (jiedushi) of Huaixi Circuit (淮西, headquartered in modern Zhumadian, Henan) rebelling against imperial rule, Emperor Dezong, believing that the armies sent against Li Xilie needed a supreme commander to coordinate their actions, commissioned his son Li Yi (李誼) the Prince of Pu to be the supreme commander of the forces against Huaixi, and he made Liu a secretary for Li Yi.

However, before Li Yi could depart Chang'an, soldiers from Jingyuan Circuit (涇原, headquartered in modern Pingliang, Gansu), at Chang'an to await deployment to the east against Li Xilie or other warlords, mutinied after they were not awarded as they believed they deserved. Emperor Dezong fled to Fengtian (奉天, in modern Xianyang, Shaanxi). Many officials followed him there, including Liu. The Jingyuan soldiers supported the general Zhu Ci as their leader, and Zhu soon claimed imperial title of his own state of Qin, competing with Emperor Dezong. While Emperor Dezong was thus kept at Fengtian, he made Liu the deputy minister of justice (刑部侍郎, Xingbu Shilang) and gave him the designation of Tong Zhongshu Menxia Pingzhangshi (同中書門下平章事), making him a chancellor de facto, along with Xiao Fu and Jiang Gongfu. When Emperor Dezong was forced to further flee to Liang Prefecture (梁州, in modern Hanzhong, Shaanxi) in 784, he made Liu Zhongshu Shilang (中書侍郎), the deputy head of the legislative bureau (中書省, Zhongshu Sheng), and continued to have Liu serve as chancellor. It was said that Liu was much liked by Emperor Dezong and was known for being careful and virtuous personally, but did not help Emperor Dezong correct his ways. After the general Li Sheng destroyed Zhu's regime later in 784 and allowed Emperor Dezong to return to Chang'an, there was an incident in which Xiao, who had just returned from a mission to survey the southern circuits, recommended that Chen Shaoyou (陳少遊), the military governor of Huainan Circuit (淮南, headquartered in modern Yangzhou, Jiangsu), who had submitted to Li Xilie during the time Emperor Dezong was away from Chang'an, be replaced by Wei Gao—a Fengxiang officer who had resisted Li Chulin. Emperor Dezong agreed. He sent the imperial eunuch messenger Ma Qinxu (馬欽緒) to inform Liu and ask Liu to discuss this matter with Xiao without consulting fellow chancellors Li Mian and Lu Han. However, Xiao was surprised by this, and, finding it inappropriate that Emperor Dezong was keeping secrets away from Li Mian and Lu, as fellow chancellors, stated:

When Emperor Yao and Emperor Shun [(mythical emperors who governed their states in great harmony)] promoted or demoted an official, their officials and the people all agreed. If Li and Lu should not be chancellors, then they should be removed. If they are to be chancellors, how can such important matters be hidden from them and not discussed with them. This is a great problem with the imperial governance. This morning, the Emperor already told me this, and I told him that this is inappropriate, and I am surprised that he is nevertheless doing this. It is not that I would not be willing to coauthor a petition with you, but I am afraid that this would become precedent. Therefore, I do not dare to inform you what my proposal is.

When Liu informed Emperor Dezong about this, Emperor Dezong was displeased. Xiao, seeing that he had lost the emperor's favor, resigned. Further, when Emperor Dezong tried to promote Lu Qi, who had been exiled after being blamed for causing Zhu's rebellion, in 785, and the imperial attendant Yuan Gao (袁高) objected, Liu and Lu Han did not dare to support Yuan's position. Yuan had to protest the decision along with several of his junior colleagues and finally prevailed on Emperor Dezong to change Emperor Dezong's mind.

Liu grew ill in late 785 and offered to resign. On November 3, 785, Emperor Dezong removed him from his chancellor position and made him the minister of census (戶部尚書, Hubu Shangshu). Liu died the next day and was publicly mourned.

== Notes and references ==
- Old Book of Tang, vol. 125.
- New Book of Tang, vol. 106.
- Zizhi Tongjian, vols. 228, 229, 231, 232.
