= Xiao Zhi =

Xiao Zhi may refer to:

- Xiao Zhi (Tang dynasty) (died 865), prime minister during Emperor Yizong's reign
- Xiao Zhi (footballer) (born 1985)
