= Ma Sui =

Chinese general and politician during Tang dynasty (726-795)

Ma Sui (Chinese: 馬燧; 726 – September 4, 795), courtesy name Xunmei (洵美), posthumous name Prince Zhuangwu of Beiping (北平莊武王), was a Chinese military general and politician of the Tang dynasty. He was known mostly for his battles against the rebel generals Li Lingyao (李靈曜), Tian Yue, Zhu Tao, and Li Huaiguang.

== Background and early career ==
Ma Sui was born in 726, during the reign of Emperor Xuanzong. His family was from Ru Prefecture (汝州, in modern Pingdingshan, Henan) and claimed to be descended from the royal house of the Warring States period state Zhao. Its traceable family line came from Ma Sui's great-great-great-grandfather Ma Xiu (馬岫), who served as an official of Northern Zhou. Ma Sui's direct male-line ancestors, including his great-grandfather Ma Juncai (馬君才), grandfather Ma Wen (馬玟), and father Ma Jilong (馬季龍), all served during the Tang dynasty. Ma Wen did not carry a high office, having served only as high as a supply officer for one of the imperial guard corps, but Ma Jilong had passed a special imperial examination for the military strategy works of Sun Tzu and Wu Qi and later served as a prefectural prefect and military commander at You Prefecture (幽州, in modern Beijing). When Ma Sui himself was young, on one occasion, when he was studying with his older brothers, he stated, "There will surely be disturbances in the realm. A real man should have accomplishments that helps the people throughout the realm, and how can he sit idly by to be merely a Confucian scholar?" As he grew, it was said that he had an unusual appearance, was tall, calm, brave, and intelligent. He was well-learned, particularly in the matters of military strategy.

In 755, the general An Lushan rebelled against Emperor Xuanzong's reign at Fanyang (范陽, i.e., You Prefecture), and soon advanced south to capture territory under imperial control and declare himself as emperor of a new state of Yan. He left his subordinate Jia Xun (賈循) in charge of Fanyang. Ma Sui, who was then at Fanyang, tried to persuade Jia to turn against An. Jia was impressed with Ma, but could not make up his mind. The proposal was leaked, however, and An sent his subordinate Han Chaoyang (韓朝陽) back to Fanyang and killed Jia. Ma fled Fanyang and was hidden by the hermit Xu Yu (徐遇) in the mountains to the west of Fanyang. After Ma hid there for a month, he left and joined the Tang resistance army at Pingyuan (平原, roughly modern Dezhou, Shandong) under Yan Zhenqing. After Pingyuan fell to Yan troops, Ma fled to Wei Commandery (魏郡, in modern Handan, Hebei). Nothing in his official biographies indicated what his activities were for the rest of the Anshi Rebellion.

== During Emperor Daizong's reign ==
During the Baoyin era (762–763) of Emperor Xuanzong's grandson Emperor Daizong, near the end of the Anshi Rebellion, Li Baoyu, the military governor (jiedushi) of Zelu Circuit (澤潞, headquartered in modern Changzhi, Shanxi), made Mao Sui the sheriff of Zhaocheng County (趙城, in modern Linfen, Shanxi). After the end of the Anshi Rebellion with the death of Yan's last emperor Shi Chaoyi in 763, the Huige troops under its Dengli Khan Yaoluoge Yidijian (藥羅葛移地健), who were in Tang lands to help with the efforts against Yan, were returning home, and on the way, they went through Tang territory without any regards for Tang local officials, killing and pillaging at will. When they were set to pass through Zelu Circuit, Li Baoyu could find no subordinates willing to be in charge of welcoming the Huige troops. Ma volunteered, and, before Huige troops arrived, he first gave gifts to their commanders. The commanders, in return, issued orders authorizing Ma to punish Huige soldiers not following orders. Ma then, as the Huige troops were arriving, had several prisoners who were already sentenced to death dressed up as his own attendants, and, if they even disobeyed his orders in any minor manner, he had them beheaded in the Huige soldiers' presence. Subdued by this display, the Huige soldiers, as they went through Zelu Circuit, were willing to abide by regulations. This impressed Li Baoyu greatly. Ma then further warned Li Baoyu that he believed the major general Pugu Huai'en, who had accepted the surrenders of four major Yan generals at the end of the Anshi Rebellion (Li Huaixian, Xue Song, Li Baochen, and Tian Chengsi) and had recommended that they be allowed to remain as military governors, and who was also Yaoluoge Yidijian's father-in-law, might be intending to rebel and having designs on Zelu and Hedong (河東, headquartered in modern Taiyuan, Shanxi) Circuits. He recommended precautions, and Li Baoyu agreed. Subsequently, when Pugu did rebel, he sought food supplies from Xue. Li Baoyu sent Ma to persuade Xue not to cooperate with Pugu, and Xue turned against Pugu. As a result, Ma was promoted.

Later, Ma served as the prefect of Zheng Prefecture (鄭州, in modern Zhengzhou, Henan). He encouraged agriculture and reduced taxes, reforms that were much appreciated by the people. In 769, he was made the prefect of Huai Prefecture (懷州, in modern Jiaozuo, Henan). He was able to comfort the people despite a devastating drought at the time. Later, as Li Baoyu had also been made the military governor of Fengxiang Circuit (鳳翔, headquartered in modern Baoji, Shaanxi), on the western border with Tufan, Ma was made the prefect of Long Prefecture (隴州, in modern Baoji). There was an old road to the west of the prefectural capital that enabled Tufan troops to advance easily on incursions, and within eight days, Ma placed boulders and planted trees to seal the road, and further set up two defensive gates on the road. On an occasion when Li Baoyu went to the capital Chang'an to pay respect to Emperor Daizong, Ma accompanied him, and Emperor Daizong, believing that Ma was able, made him the prefect of Shang Prefecture (商州, in modern Shangluo, Shaanxi) and put him in charge of the supply lines going through Shang Prefecture.

In 775, the soldiers stationed at the important base Heyang (河陽, in modern Jiaozuo, Henan) mutinied and expelled their commander Chang Xiuming (常休明). Emperor Daizong made Ma the commander of Heyang to replace Chang. In 776, following the death of Tian Shenyu (田神玉) the acting military governor of Biansong Circuit (汴宋, headquartered in modern Kaifeng, Henan), Tian's subordinate Li Lingyao seized the control of the circuit. Initially, Emperor Daizong tried to appease Li Lingyao by making him the acting military governor, but after Li Lingyao continued to be defiant of imperial authorities, Emperor Daizong commissioned Ma, Li Zhongchen, Li Mian, assisted by Chen Shaoyou (陳少遊) and Li Zhengji, to attack Biansong. In fall 775, Ma and Li Zhongchen rendezvoused at Zheng Prefecture. Li Lingyao launched a surprise attack against their forces and causing them to withdraw; a large portion of Li Zhongchen's army, from Huaixi Circuit (淮西, headquartered in modern Zhumadian, Henan), deserted, while the people of Zheng Prefecture panicked and fled to the eastern capital Luoyang. Li Zhongchen wanted to retreat, but Ma opposed, stating, "We are regular troops attacking rebels. Why do we worry about defeat? Why do we give us this chance for battlefield accomplishments?" He dug in, and in response, Li Zhongchen gathered his soldiers and also dug in. They then moved toward Bian Prefecture, with Ma marching north of the Bian River (a canal connecting the Yellow River and the Huai River, flowing through Bian Prefecture) and Li Zhongchen marching south of the Bian River. They were joined by Chen's forces, and together they battled Li Lingyao's forces to the west of Bian Prefecture's capital, defeating Li Lingyao. Li Lingyao withdrew within the capital, and Ma and Li Zhongchen put it under siege. After they further defeated relief forces commanded by Tian Yue (the nephew of Tian Chengsi, who was allied with Li Lingyao), Li Lingyao fled but was eventually captured by Li Mian's forces and delivered to Chang'an to be executed. Ma, knowing that Li Zhongchen was fierce and cruel, decided not to contend with Li Zhongchen as to the credits for the victory and therefore refused to enter Bian Prefecture's capital. Li Zhongchen entered Bian Prefecture and, on his subsequent reports, credited only himself, as Ma predicted, going as far as killing the Biansong general Li Senghui (李僧惠), who had turned against Li Lingyao and who also contributed much to the victory.

== During Emperor Dezong's reign ==
=== Campaign against Tian Yue ===
In 779, Emperor Daizong died and was succeeded by his son Emperor Dezong. Shortly thereafter, Ma Sui was made the acting military governor of Hedong Circuit and the mayor of Taiyuan Municipality. Hedong Circuit had recently (in 778) suffered a major defeat against Huige forces, and its army was weak at the time. Ma carried new recruitment for cavalry soldiers from the rank of the officers' horse carers, built new battle wagons, and conducted rounds of battle training, thus rebuilding the Hedong Army within the span of a year. In 781, he was at Chang'an to pay homage to Emperor Dezong, when he warned Emperor Dezong that Tian Yue, who had succeeded Tian Chengsi as the military governor of Weibo Circuit (魏博, headquartered in modern Handan) in 779 and taken a conciliatory and submissive posture toward the imperial government, would nevertheless rebel eventually and that precautions needed to be taken.

Meanwhile, in 781, Li Baochen and Li Zhengji died, and their sons Li Weiyue and Li Na requested to succeed their fathers, to be military governors of Chengde (成德, headquartered in modern Shijiazhuang, Hebei) and Pinglu (平盧, headquartered in modern Tai'an, Shandong), respectively. Emperor Dezong refused. They thus prepared for war against the imperial government, and Tian and Liang Chongyi (the military governor of Shannan East Circuit (山南東道, headquartered in modern Xiangfan, Hubei)), allied to them, prepared for war as well. Tian, as Zhaoyi Circuit (昭義, the new name for Zelu Circuit), whose military governor Li Baozhen (Li Baoyu's cousin) was loyal to the imperial government and which held two prefectures close to his own capital, decided to attack Zhaoyi Circuit. He put Zhaoyi's city Linming (臨洺, in modern Handan) under siege. Emperor Dezong sent Ma and Li Sheng to aid Li Baozhen. Ma, before his arrival in the region, sent a humble letter to Tian, to make Tian believe that Ma was fearful of him. Ma then rendezvoused with Li Baozhen and attacked Tian's subordinate Yang Chaoguang (楊朝光), in charge of logistics and had his subordinate Li Ziliang (李自良) cut off a potential path for Tian to aid Yang—going as far as telling Li Ziliang, "If Tian Yue got past you, I will cut off your head!" Tian indeed tried to aid Yang, but was blocked by Li Ziliang, and Ma and Li Baozhen defeated and killed Yang. They then advanced to Linming and defeated Tian as well, forcing Tian to flee back to his capital Wei Prefecture (魏州).

In spring 782, Ma, Li Baozhen, and Li Sheng, joined by Li Qiu (李艽), the military governor of Heyang Circuit (converted from Heyang Base), engaged Tian, who was aided by soldiers from Chengde and Pinglu Circuits, near Wei Prefecture, and they had a major victory over Tian. Tian was again forced to flee back to Wei Prefecture. The officer that Tian had put in charge of Wei Prefecture, Li Changchun (李長春), was ready to turn against Tian and submit to the imperial government, and when Tian arrived during the night, he closed the city gates. However, Ma and Li Baozhen, who had grudges against each other over Ma's defense of Li Baozhen's subordinate Yang Shu (楊鉥), whom Li Baozhen had wanted to kill, could not chase after Tian quickly, and by morning, Li Changchun was forced to open the city gates, allowing Tian to reenter, execute Li Changchun, and get ready to defend the city. Only after more than a day did Ma and Li Baozhen arrive at Wei Prefecture, and they could not immediately capture it.

Meanwhile, after a number of victories that Zhu Tao, the acting military governor of Lulong Circuit (盧龍, headquartered in modern Beijing), and Li Baochen's former subordinate Zhang Xiaozhong, had over Li Weiyue, Li Weiyue was killed by his own subordinate Wang Wujun, who then surrendered. However, Emperor Dezong then alienated both Zhu (by not giving him part of Chengde's territory that he had captured) and Wang Wujun (by not making him the military governor of Chengde as Emperor Dezong had implicitly promised anyone who would kill Li Weiyue). Tian made overtures to Zhu and Wang, and they agreed to ally with him. They advanced south toward Weibo. Meanwhile, the dispute between Ma and Li Baozhen flared up further when Li Baozhen took some of his own soldiers to defend Zhaoyi's Xing Prefecture (邢州, in modern Xingtai, Hebei) in case Wang attacked it—drawing Ma's ire and causing Ma to consider withdrawing back to Hedong. Only with Li Sheng's intercession did Ma and Li Baozhen make peace. Meanwhile, Emperor Dezong sent the general Li Huaiguang to aid Ma and Li Baozhen, while bestowing on Ma the honorary chancellor designation of Tong Zhongshu Menxia Pingzhangshi (同中書門下平章事).

In summer 782, Zhu and Wang arrived at Wei Prefecture and prepared to battle the imperial troops sieging Wei Prefecture. Li Huaiguang also arrived and, against Ma's advice of waiting until his soldiers had enough rest, decided to battle Zhu and Wang immediately. He had initial successes, but Wang cut his soldiers off from each other with a charge, leading to a major defeat for the imperial forces. Zhu and Wang then tried to cut off the imperial troops escape, but Ma then promised to request that Emperor Dezong put Zhu in charge of the entire region north of the Yellow River. Zhu believed him and did not pursue imperial forces further, so the imperial forces were able to withdraw over a river from Wei Prefecture, and were able to take up a posture against the rebel forces, thus putting the armies into a stalemate. Emperor Dezong gave Ma the title of military governor of Weibo, while Zhu, Wang, Tian, and Li Na all took princely titles to signify independence from Tang.

=== During Zhu Ci's and Li Huaiguang's rebellions ===
In fall 783, soldiers from Jingyuan Circuit (涇原, headquartered in modern Pingliang, Gansu), in Chang'an to await deployment to the east, mutinied when they became angry that Emperor Dezong was not giving them rewards. Emperor Dezong fled to Fengtian (奉天, in modern Xianyang, Shaanxi), and the Jingyuan soldiers supported Zhu Tao's brother Zhu Ci (who had been earlier removed from his command due to Zhu Tao's rebellion) as their leader. Zhu Ci soon declared himself emperor of a new state of Qin. When Emperor Dezong's messengers, delivering these news, arrived at the imperial forces' camps near Wei Prefecture, the imperial forces scattered, with Li Huaiguang heading toward Fengtian to try to save Emperor Dezong, and Ma Sui, Li Baozhen, and Li Qiu each returning to their own circuits. Subsequently, after persuasion from Li Baozhen, Wang Wujun secretly agreed to resubmit to the imperial cause, and Ma and Li Baozhen both maintained contact with Wang. Upon return to Hedong Circuit, Ma strengthened the defenses of its capital Taiyuan by diverting the waters of nearby Fen River to create defensive ponds and moats around Taiyuan. He also sent his subordinate Wang Quan (王權) with 5,000 soldiers, along with his own son Ma Hui (馬彙), to try to aid Emperor Dezong. Emperor Dezong gave Ma Sui the title of acting Situ (司徒, one of the Three Excellencies) and created him the Prince of Beiping. Meanwhile, Li Huaiguang fought off a Zhu Ci assault on Fengtian and saved Emperor Dezong from certain capture or death in late 783, but subsequently, angry over Emperor Dezong's refusal to meet him after the battle, rebelled in spring 784 against Emperor Dezong as well, forcing Emperor Dezong to flee to Liang Prefecture (梁州, in modern Hanzhong, Shaanxi). After Emperor Dezong fled to Liang Prefecture, Wang Quan and Ma Hui returned to Hedong Prefecture.

Soon, though, with many of Li Huaiguang's subordinates turning against him, he withdrew from the Chang'an region to Hezhong (河中, in modern Yuncheng, Shanxi). Li Sheng, who was then the commander of the Tang forces in the region, then recaptured Chang'an from Zhu Ci in summer 784, and Zhu Ci was killed in flight. Li Sheng welcomed Emperor Dezong back to Chang'an. He subsequently put Ma Sui in charge of the operations against Li Huaiguang, along with Hun Jian and Luo Yuanguang (駱元光). Ma was quickly able to get three prefectures previously under Li Huaiguang's control—Jin (晉州), Ci (慈州), and Xi (隰州) (all in modern Linfen, Shanxi) to surrender to him, and Emperor Dezong wanted to give him the command of the three prefectures as a new Jincixi Circuit (晉慈隰). Ma declined—pointing out that, pursuant to his own recommendations, the three prefectures had already been promised to Kang Rizhi (康日知), who had stood up against Wang Wujun but whose Shenzhao Circuit (深趙, headquartered in modern Shijiazhuang) had been promised to Wang Wujun as enticement for Wang Wujun to return to the imperial fold. Emperor Dezong much approved of Ma's willingness to yield the three prefectures, and when Kang arrived, Ma transferred the three prefectures to Kang, with their treasuries intact, much to Kang's surprise and happiness. Ma subsequently continued to attack Li Huaiguang's territory, seizing it piece by piece. However, with imperial forces lacking food, the opinion among the imperial opinions largely wanted to try to pardon Li Huaiguang and persuade him to resubmit to imperial authority. Ma opposed, however, and when he was at Chang'an to pay homage to Emperor Dezong in spring 785, he requested one more month of time to subdue Li Huaiguang, and Emperor Dezong agreed. He subsequently persuaded Li Huaiguang's officer Xu Tingguang (徐庭光), who was defending Changchun Palace (長春宮, in modern Weinan, Shaanxi), to surrender, and then approached Hezhong with Hun and Luo. Li Huaiguang, facing defeat, committed suicide, ending his rebellion, 27 days after Ma had requested one more month to subdue him. Emperor Dezong gave Ma the additional title of Shizhong (侍中), the head of the examination bureau of government (門下省), a post considered one for a chancellor.

=== After Li Huaiguang's rebellion ===
In 768, during a major Tufan incursion, led by Tufan's chancellor Nanam Shang Gyaltsen Lhanang ("Shang Jiezan" (尚結贊) in Chinese), Emperor Dezong had Ma Sui, along with Li Sheng and Hun Jian, converge against Shang. Shang, who was trying to find a way to get the three generals, whom he saw as the only obstacles between him and a conquest of Tang, removed from their commands. With Li Sheng vehemently opposing peace with Tufan, Shang, who was running into difficulties due to his livestock dying during the campaign, therefore sought peace through Ma. Ma, believing in Shang's sincerity and having prior grudges with Li Sheng, advocated a peace agreement and subsequently arrived at Chang'an to further advocate it. With Ma and another chancellor who was also a political enemy of Li Sheng's, Zhang Yanshang, advocating peace, Emperor Dezong removed Li Sheng from his command at Fengxiang (鳳翔, in modern Baoji, Shaanxi) and recalled him to Chang'an, getting ready to make peace with Tufan.

By summer 787, Emperor Dezong and Shang had negotiated a peace treaty, and Hun, as Emperor Dezong's emissary, was set to meet with Shang at Pingliangchuan (平涼川, in modern Pingliang). Li Sheng, fearing Tufan treachery, instructed Hun to be careful, but Zhang, hearing this, accused Li Sheng of interfering with the peace with Tufan. Emperor Dezong thus instructed Hun to be relaxes, not to aggravate Tufan in any way. On July 8, 787, at the meeting site, Shang laid a trap for Hun and launched a sudden attack, killing and capturing many of Hun's attendants, but Hun escaped. When the news reached Chang'an, Emperor Dezong was so panicked that he considered fleeing Chang'an, but remained due to Li Sheng's advice. Shang, in order to further aggravate Emperor Dezong's attitude toward Ma, intentionally released Ma's nephew Ma Yan (馬弇), along with the imperial eunuch messenger Ju Wenzhen (俱文珍). As a result of this debacle, Zhang claimed an illness and retired, while Emperor Dezong recalled Ma Sui to the capital and stripped him of his command, keeping him at Chang'an to serve as Shizhong and Situ. Emperor Dezong gave Li Ziliang the command of Hedong, despite Li Ziliang's reluctance due to his longtime service under Ma.

Later in the year, Emperor Dezong made a respected senior advisor, Li Mi—who had previously served his grandfather Emperor Suzong and father Emperor Daizong but declined major offices—Chancellor. At a meeting that Emperor Dezong hosted for Li Mi, with Liu Hun, Ma, and Li Sheng also present, Li Mi openly asked Emperor Dezong to guarantee Li Sheng's and Ma's personal safety, due to their great achievements. Emperor Dezong agreed. Later, when Li Mi advocated an alliance with Huige against Tufan, despite Emperor Dezong's longstanding hatred toward Huige—as, during an incident in 762 while he was still the Prince of Yong under Emperor Dezong, a number of his staff members had been arrested and killed by Huige's then-khan Dengli Khan Yaoluoge Yidijian (藥羅葛移地建) over a dispute in the meeting protocol between the young prince and the khan—Li Sheng and Ma spoke in favor of the alliance, finally persuading Emperor Dezong in conjunction with Li Mi's advice.

In 793, when Ma was meeting Emperor Dezong, Emperor Dezong, on account of Ma's having an illness in his feet, ordered that he not be required to bow. During the meeting, when Ma fell due to his illness, Emperor Dezong personally helped him up. Ma subsequently tried to resign his Shizhong post, but Emperor Dezong declined. Ma died in 795 and was buried with great honors.

Liu Xu, the lead editor of the Old Book of Tang, had this comment about Ma:

Ma Sui was brave and strong. He thought deeply before he battled, and he was capable in encouraging the soldiers and personally leading armies. He personally issued orders, and the soldiers were all touched, willing to die in battle. He was never defeated, and his strategies led to victories, more than other generals of the time. But he had the ability to capture Tian Yue and failed to do so, and he accepted the false words of the Tufan general and requested peace. At the meeting at Pingliang, a great general nearly fell because of this, and the capital was shaken. He can be referred to as having more than sufficient abilities but not enough attention. This is why commentators have regrets about him.

Ouyang Xiu, the lead editor of the New Book of Tang, indicated his agreement, but further commented:

Ma Sui was a talented man, and the people in the realm, where they could find his faults, criticized him for his faults. While his guilt should not be covered up because of his accomplishments, nor should his accomplishments be covered up because of his guilt.

== Notes and references ==
- Old Book of Tang, vol. 134.
- New Book of Tang, vol. 155.
- Zizhi Tongjian, vols. 217, 222, 225, 226, 227, 228, 229, 231, 232, 233, 235.
