= Lu Qi (Tang dynasty) =

Chinese politician

Lu Qi (Chinese: 盧杞), courtesy name Ziliang (子良), was a politician of China's Tang dynasty, serving as a chancellor during the reign of Emperor Dezong. He was characterized as treacherous and selfish in traditional historical accounts, and traditional historians blamed him for provoking the rebellions of Zhu Ci and Li Huaiguang, which greatly weakened the Tang state.

== Background and early career ==
It is not known when Lu Qi was born. His grandfather Lu Huaishen was a chancellor early in the reign of Emperor Xuanzong. His father Lu Yi (盧奕) served as an imperial official as well, and was one of the officials in charge of the eastern capital Luoyang when the general An Lushan rebelled at Fanyang in 755, toward the end of Emperor Xuanzong's reign. An quickly advanced to Luoyang, and Lu Yi, while sending his wife and sons away, remained in Luoyang himself, seeing it as his responsibility to do so. When Luoyang fell, Lu Yi remained faithful to the Tang cause and continued to curse the rebels even as he was under threat of execution, and he was executed.

Because how his father had died in imperial service, Lu Qi became an official early in his life. He was said to be ugly in appearance, such that he was compared to a ghost; however, he was also said to be frugal, and he gained a good reputation and was compared to his grandfather Lu Huaishen. While the major general Pugu Huai'en served as the military governor (Jiedushi) of Shuofang Circuit (朔方, headquartered in modern Yinchuan, Ningxia), he invited Lu to serve as a secretary for him. He was later removed on account of illness. Later, he successively served as the deputy minister of vassal affairs (鴻臚丞, Honglu Cheng), imperial censor (殿中侍御史, Dianzhong Shiyushi), and Shangbu Yuanwailang (膳部員外郎), a low-level official at the ministry of rites (禮部, Libu). He later was set to serve as the prefect of Zhong Prefecture (忠州, in modern Chongqing), but when he went to visit his superior Wei Boyu (衛伯玉), the military governor of Jingnan Circuit (荊南, headquartered in modern Jingzhou, Hubei), he displeased Wei, and subsequently, he resigned under excuse of illness and returned to the capital Chang'an. He later successively served as Xingbu Yuanwailang (刑部員外郎), a low-level official at the ministry of justice (刑部, Xingbu); Jinbu Langzhong (金部郎中), a mid-level official at the ministry of census (戶部, Hubu); and Libu Langzhong (吏部郎中, Libu Langzhong), a mid-level official at the ministry of civil service affairs (吏部, Libu). He later served as the prefect of Guo Prefecture (虢州, in modern Sanmenxia, Henan). Early in the Jianzhong era (780-783) of Emperor Xuanzong's great-grandson Emperor Dezong, he was recalled to Chang'an to serve as deputy chief imperial censor (御史中丞, Yushi Zhongcheng). On one occasion, when he was meeting the senior general Guo Ziyi at Guo's mansion, Guo personally greeted him and sent his concubines and servants away — contrary to Guo's typical custom of having the concubines and servants greet the guests. When later asked why, Guo responded, "Lu Qi is ugly and treacherous. If I let the women see him, they would surely laugh at him. If he later become powerful, my household would be wiped out."

== As chancellor ==
=== Before Zhu Ci's rebellion ===
In 781, Lu Qi, who had gained Emperor Dezong's favor because of his ability to speak well, was promoted to be the governor (觀察使, Guanchashi) of Jingji Circuit (京畿, i.e., the Chang'an region). By that point, Yang Yan, who had been the sole chancellor, had drawn secret anger from Emperor Dezong for informing regional governors that Emperor Dezong's own enmity for the senior official Liu Yan was responsible for Liu's death in 780. Later in 781, Emperor Dezong promoted Lu to be Menxia Shilang (門下侍郎), the deputy head of the examination bureau of government (門下省, Menxia Sheng) and gave him the designation Tong Zhongshu Menxia Pingzhangshi (同中書門下平章事), making him a chancellor de facto, to divert power from Yang. As Lu lacked literary talent, Yang looked down on him, and while it was customary for chancellors to have lunch together, Yang often found excuses to avoid meeting with Lu, drawing Lu's resentment. As chancellor, Lu was said to be petty and using treacherous tactics against those who dared not associate with him.

Meanwhile, Emperor Dezong, who had ambitions to wipe out warlordism and reassert imperial authority throughout the realm, had put Li Xilie the military governor of Huaixi Circuit (淮西, headquartered in modern Zhumadian, Henan), in charge of a campaign against Liang Chongyi, the military governor of Shannan East Circuit (山南東道, headquartered in modern Xiangfan, Hubei), who had ruled Shannan East semi-independently from the imperial regime and had an alliance with several other regional warlords, Tian Yue (who ruled Weibo Circuit (魏博, headquartered in modern Handan, Hebei)), Li Weiyue (who ruled Chengde Circuit (成德, headquartered in modern Shijiazhuang, Hebei)), and Li Na (who ruled Pinglu Circuit (平盧, headquartered in modern Tai'an, Shandong)). Emperor Dezong's commissioning of Li Xilie was over Yang's strenuous objection, as Yang felt that Li Xilie could not be trusted. When Li Xilie's army was not launched for sometime due to rain, Lu secretly suggested to Emperor Dezong that it was actually because Li Xilie was resentful of Yang and that Emperor Dezong should remove Yang to placate Li Xilie. Emperor Dezong agreed, and in fall 781, he made Yang Zuo Pushe (左僕射), one of the heads of the executive bureau, but no longer chancellor. Subsequently, Lu falsely accused Yang of treason, and Yang was exiled and then executed.

Later in 781, Li Wei (李洧), the cousin to Li Na's father and predecessor Li Zhengji, whom Li Zhengji had made the prefect of Xu Prefecture (徐州, in modern Xuzhou, Jiangsu), contacted and offered to submit to the imperial government. He sent his assistant Cui Cheng (崔程) to Chang'an and suggested that if he were made the governor of a new circuit containing Xu Prefecture and two other prefectures belonging to Pinglu — Hai (海州, in modern Lianyungang, Jiangsu) and Yi (沂州, in modern Linyi, Shandong) Prefectures — those prefectures would turn against Li Na and submit to the imperial government as well. When Cui arrived at Chang'an, however, he made the mistake of first meeting Lu's chancellor colleague Zhang Yi rather than Lu. Lu, viewing this as a snub, refused. Subsequently, although the Li Wei still submitted, and the imperial government was able to take Xu Prefecture, they were not able to take the other two prefectures. Meanwhile, wanting to eliminate Zhang as a competitor for power, he pretended to be willing to become the military governor of the important Fengxiang Circuit (鳳翔, headquartered in modern Baoji, Shaanxi), a key defensive position against Tufan, and then making comments that induced Emperor Dezong to make Zhang the military governor of Fengxiang instead. It was said that early in Emperor Dezong's reign, when Cui Youfu was the main chancellor, Cui had led him to be lenient, and therefore Emperor Dezong was compared by the people to his well-regarded ancestor Emperor Taizong, but after Lu became chancellor, he led Emperor Dezong to be strict, harsh, and suspicious, causing disappointment throughout the realm.

The imperial campaigns, meanwhile, appeared to be bearing fruit, as Li Xilie defeated Liang and Liang committed suicide, bringing Shannan East into the imperial fold; Li Weiyue's subordinate Wang Wujun killed Li Weiyue and submitted to the imperial government; and both Tian and Li Na were under siege by imperial forces. However, Emperor Dezong then angered both Wang and Zhu Tao the acting military governor of Lulong Circuit (盧龍, headquartered in modern Beijing), whose victories against Chengde forces had been instrumental in causing Wang's mutiny against Li Weiyue, by not rewarding them in accordance of what they believed they deserved. They therefore turned against the imperial government and allied with Tian, defeating imperial forces sieging Tian at Weibo's capital Wei Prefecture. As the campaigns continued, the imperial treasury was being drained, and Emperor Dezong, under suggestion from the imperial scholars Wei Dubin (韋都賓) and Chen Jing (陳京), issued an edict forcing merchants to make mandatory loans to the government. On one occasion, merchants, burdened by these "loans", surrounded Lu on the streets of Chang'an and begged him to intercede on their behalf, he was scared by the display and comforted them, but once he was able to get away from the crowd did not make any actual proposals to help them.

Around this time, in addition to Zhang Yi, several officials were also said to be victims of Lu's treachery:

- Yuan Xiu (源休), who had just gone on a difficult diplomatic mission to Huige, was ostensibly promoted to be the minister of palace supplies (光祿卿, Guanglu Qing) to avoid his being promoted yet higher by Emperor Dezong.
- Yan Zhenqing, a senior official whom Lu already disliked and who then further embarrassed Lu by reminding him that Yan had publicly mourned Lu's father Lu Yi when Lu Yi's head was passed through his territory during the Anshi Rebellion, was sent on a dangerous and futile mission to persuade Li Xilie, who had begun to undertake imperial pretensions and would eventually declare himself emperor, to resubmit to Emperor Dezong; Yan was eventually executed by Li Xilie.
- Li Kui, a former chancellor who was old in age but whom Lu feared because of his senior status and abilities, was sent as an emissary to Tufan, a mission that Li Kui tried to beg off due to his old age, claiming he might not survive such a mission; Li Kui was eventually able to make the mission but died on his return journey.

=== During Zhu Ci's rebellion ===
In fall 783, soldiers from Jingyuan Circuit (涇原, headquartered in modern Pingliang, Gansu), at Chang'an to await deployment to the east, mutinied after not receiving awards that they believed they deserved. Emperor Dezong fled to Fengtian (奉天, in modern Xianyang, Shaanxi), initially taking only his family members and a small group of eunuchs and imperial guards with him. Lu and fellow chancellor Guan Bo, in the confusion, had to jump over the walls of the office of chancellors, located at the legislative bureau (中書省, Zhongshu Sheng), to catch up with Emperor Dezong.

Emperor Dezong issued emergency edicts seeking aid from the nearby circuits. Meanwhile, the Jingyuan soldiers supported Zhu Tao's brother Zhu Ci, who had been removed from his command in 782 due to Zhu Tao's rebellion, as their leader. Zhu Ci initially claimed that he was merely calming the situation at Chang'an and was ready to welcome Emperor Dezong back to Chang'an, but soon there were rumors that Zhu was planning to claim imperial title himself and attack Emperor Dezong at Fengtian. In light of this, some officials who had fled to Fengtian suggested that Fengtian's defenses be shored up, but Lu, misjudging the situation, argued to Emperor Dezong that Zhu would surely remain faithful to Tang and advocated taking no precautions at all and stopping the incoming aid troops, although at Jiang Gongfu's advice Emperor Dezong continued to receive the aid troops into Fengtian. At suggestion of Lu and Bai Zhizhen (白志貞) the commander of the imperial guards, Emperor Dezong sent his granduncle Wu Xu (吳漵) (Emperor Daizong's mother's brother) to Chang'an to communicate with Zhu. Zhu initially welcomed Wu as an honored imperial emissary, but soon put Wu to death. He declared himself emperor of a new state of Qin.

Meanwhile, the official Cui Ning arrived at Fengtian several days after Emperor Dezong did. Emperor Dezong was pleased, but Lu heard that, on the way to Fengtian, Cui had made comments that Lu was responsible for misleading the emperor into this disaster. Lu feared that Cui would accuse him of causing the calamity, and therefore secretly plotted with an official who had arrived at Fengitan with Cui, Wang Hong (王翃). He had Wang make a secret report to Emperor Dezong that on the way to Fengtian, Cui had frequently stopped to defecate or urinate and appeared to be waiting for Zhu's soldiers. Lu and Wang also forced Cui's secretary Kang Dan (康湛) into forging a letter from Cui to Zhu, offering to betray Fengtian to him. Lu, presenting the forgery to Emperor Dezong, thus falsely accused Cui of treason. Emperor Dezong believed Lu's accusations and executed Cui.

Zhu soon put Fengtian under siege. A Tang aid force, commanded by the generals Du Xiquan (杜希全), Dai Xiuyan (戴休顏), Shi Changchun (時常春), and Li Jianhui (李建徽), was approaching Fengtian and requesting imperial instructions on which way to advance into the city. Guan and the general Hun Jian suggested having the aid force march over Qianling — the hill containing the tomb of Emperor Dezong's ancestor Emperor Gaozong — so that they would have better tactical position. Lu, arguing that doing so was disrespectful, suggested having the aid force march through a valley, despite Hun's protestations that doing so would expose the aid force to catapult attacks by Qin forces. Emperor Dezong agreed with Lu, and subsequently, the aid force was ambushed and, after suffering heavy losses, was forced to withdraw without ever reaching Fengtian. This incident drew a comment from the Song Dynasty/Yuan Dynasty historian Hu Sanxing (the commentator of the Zizhi Tongjian):

Ever since the wars north and south of the Yellow River erupted, and through Emperor Dezong's flight, every single suggestion that Lu Qi made was harmful to the state and harmful to the people. Yet, Emperor Dezong continued to trust in him. How much did this demonstrate Emperor Dezong's incompetence?

Soon, Fengtian was in a desperate state, but was saved when Li Huaiguang the military governor of Shuofang Circuit (朔方, headquartered in modern Yinchuan, Ningxia), who had been fighting Tian Yue in the east, arrived in haste and forced Zhu to withdraw back to Chang'an. Meanwhile, though, it had become common knowledge that Li Huaiguang despised Lu, Bai, and Zhao Zan (趙贊) — and that he would recommend to Emperor Dezong that those officials be removed. When Lu heard this, he believed that he had to prevent a meeting between Emperor Dezong and Li Huaiguang at all costs, and therefore suggested to Emperor Dezong order Li Huaiguang to attack Chang'an at once. Emperor Dezong agreed, and ordered Li Huaiguang to rendezvous with Li Sheng, Li Jianhui, and Yang Huiyuan (楊惠元) to attack Chang'an. Li Huaiguang, angry that he was not even able to meet the emperor, began to resent Emperor Dezong. He stopped his army's movement and submitted petitions accusing Lu and the others of crimes and further accusing them of being responsible for the Jingyuan mutiny. Li Huaiguang's accusations were joined by those from many other officials. Around the new year 784, Emperor Dezong was forced to demote and exile Lu, Bai, and Zhao — in Lu's case, to be the military advisor to the prefect of Xin Prefecture (新洲, in modern Yunfu, Guangdong). (Due to this incident, however, Li Huaiguang's relationship with Emperor Dezong was permanently damaged, and Li Huaiguang would rebel himself later in 784; his rebellion would not be suppressed until 785.)

== After demotion ==
Despite his being forced to exile Lu Qi, however, Emperor Dezong continued to miss him, and thereafter, the imperial scholar Lu Zhi, whose opinions Emperor Dezong otherwise greatly respected, was said to be not promoted partly because Lu Zhi was continuing to attack Lu Qi in his advice.

In 785, after a general pardon, Lu Qi was promoted to be the secretary general of Ji Prefecture (吉州, in modern Ji'an, Jiangxi). He made the comment, "Surely, I will soon return to the capital." Soon thereafter, Emperor Dezong ordered the imperial attendant Yuan Gao (袁高) to draft an edict further promoting Lu to be the prefect of Rao Prefecture (饒州, in modern Shangrao, Jiangxi). Yuan, seeing this as a sign that, despite all Lu had done, Emperor Dezong was planning to eventually recall him, and he, alarmed, approached the chancellors Lu Han and Liu Congyi and requested that they advise Emperor Dezong against the promotion. Lu Han and Liu did not dare to, and they had another imperial attendant draft the edict instead. When the edict was set to be issued, Yuan held it and refused to issue it; he was joined in this by his colleagues Chen Jing (陳京) and Zhao Xu (趙需), drawing great anger from Emperor Dezong — but eventually, with the chancellor Li Mian also pointing out that promoting Lu Qi would disappoint the people, Emperor Dezong relented. Instead, Lu Qi was only made the secretary general of Li Prefecture (澧州, in modern Changde, Hunan). He eventually died there without ever returning to Chang'an, although the year of his death was not recorded in history. Emperor Dezong still missed Lu Qi, however, and eventually, he made Lu Qi's son Lu Yuanfu (盧元輔) an imperial official. Lu Yuanfu was effective as an imperial official, and it was said that he was not tainted by his father's ill reputation.

== Notes and references ==
- Old Book of Tang, vol. 135.
- New Book of Tang, vol. 223, part 2.
- Zizhi Tongjian, vols. 226, 227, 228, 229, 231.
