= Xiao Zhi (Tang dynasty) =

Xiao Zhi (蕭寘) (died 865) was an official of the Chinese dynasty Tang dynasty, who briefly served as a chancellor during the reign of Emperor Yizong.

Very little is known about Xiao Zhi's career. His family descended from the imperial house of Liang dynasty and had a number of members who served as chancellor during Tang dynasty, including his great-great-grandfather Xiao Song and his grandfather Xiao Fu. However, he had no biography in either of the official histories of Tang, the Old Book of Tang and the New Book of Tang — although the New Book of Tang noted in his grandfather Xiao Fu's biography:

Xiao Fu had a son, Xiao Zhan [(蕭湛)]. Xiao Zhan had a son, Xiao Zhi, who served as chancellor during the Xiantong era. He had no notable accomplishments, and so history omits his biography.

In any case, it is known that as of 864, Xiao Zhi was serving as the deputy minister of defense (兵部侍郎, Bingbu Shilang) and the director of taxation, when Emperor Yizong gave him the designation Tong Zhongshu Menxia Pingzhangshi (同中書門下平章事), making him a chancellor de facto. Xiao Zhi served as chancellor until his death in 865. Xiao Zhi's son Xiao Gou later served as a chancellor during the reign of Emperor Yizong's son Emperor Xizong.

== Notes and references ==
- Zizhi Tongjian, vol. 250.
