= Li Sheng (Tang dynasty) =

Tang dynasty general (727-793)

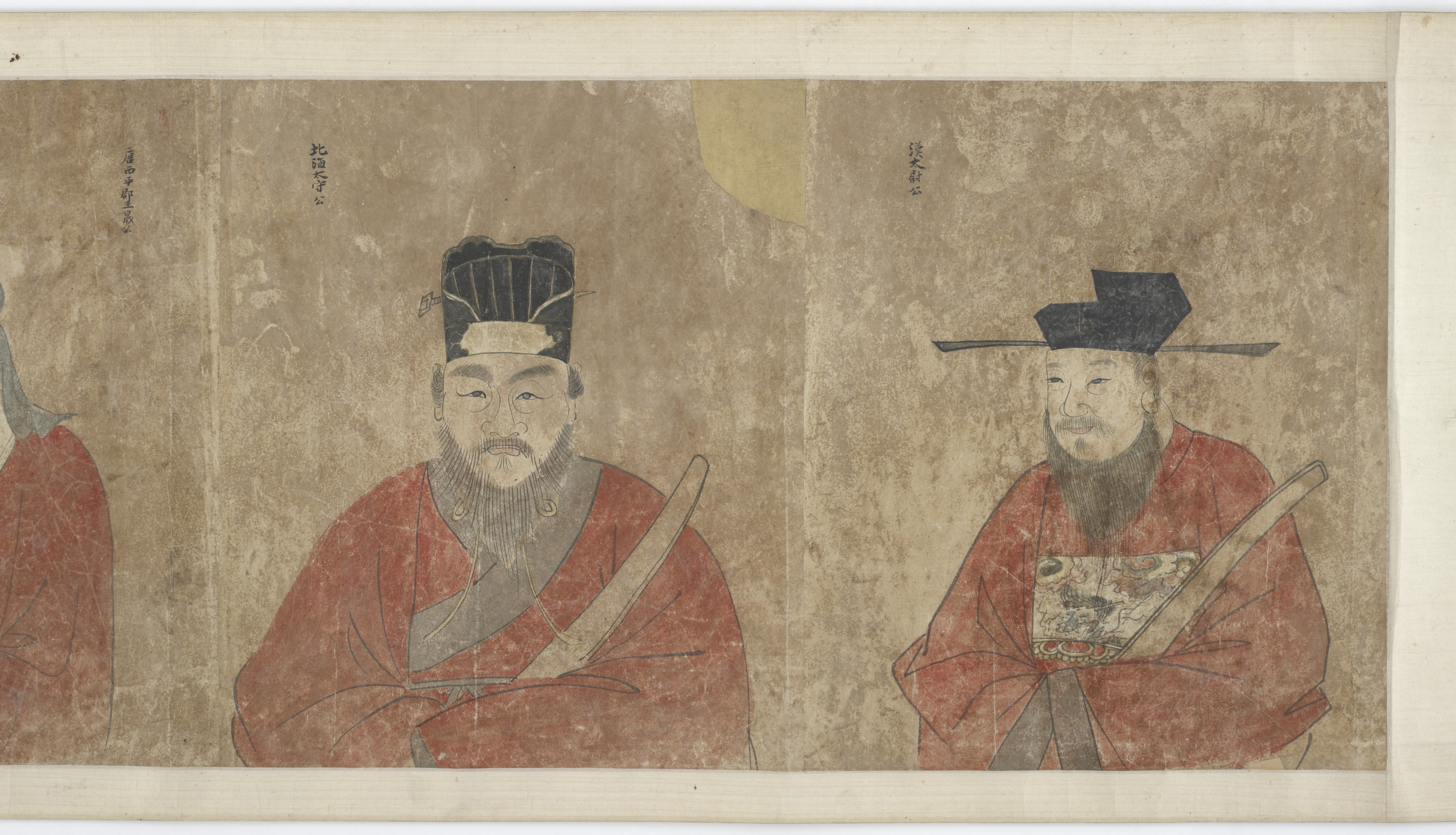
- Died: Jing Prefecture
- Resting place: Gaoling County
- Children: Li Xian, Li Mou, Li Su, Li Mou, Li Fu, Li Yuan, Li Cong, Li Zong, Li Xun, Li Ping, Li Shu, Li Yi, Li Ting, Li Ji, Li Yin, Li Yin
- Parent(s): Li Qin

Li Sheng (李晟) (727 – September 13, 793), courtesy name Liangqi (良器), formally Prince Zhongwu of Xiping (西平忠武王), was a Chinese military general, monarch, and politician during the Tang dynasty, mostly known for his service under Emperor Dezong in destroying the rebel Zhu Ci and restoring Emperor Dezong.

== Background ==
Li Sheng was born in 727, during the reign of Emperor Xuanzong. His family was from Tao Prefecture (洮州, in modern Dingxi, Gansu). His ancestors, including his grandfather Li Sigong (李思恭) and father Li Qin (李欽), served as low-level military officers on the borders. Li Qin died when Li Sheng was only a few years old, and it was said that Li Sheng was filially pious to his mother. He was brave and strong-willed, and capable in riding and archery.

Li Sheng started his military service when he was 17. At that time, he was tall and brave, impressing the army. He served under Wang Zhongsi, the military governor (jiedushi) of Hexi Circuit (河西, headquartered in modern Wuwei, Gansu), on a campaign against Tufan. At one fort, there was a Tufan officer who was fierce in defending on top of the fort walls and who killed many Tang soldiers. Wang requested for a volunteer to strike down the Tufan officer, and Li volunteered; he then fired a single arrow that killed the Tufan officer. Wang was impressed, patted his back, and stated, "This is one who can rival 10,000." Later, Gao Shengya (高昇雅) the military governor of Fengxiang Circuit (鳳翔, headquartered in modern Baoji, Shaanxi), who had known Li by reputation, invited Li to serve under him. While serving under Gao, Li was victorious in two campaigns against rebellious Qiang tribes, and was promoted to the rank of general.

== During Emperor Daizong's reign ==
Early in the Guangde era (763–764) of Emperor Xuanzong's grandson Emperor Daizong, the then-military governor of Fengxiang Circuit, Sun Zhizhi (孫志直), made Li Sheng the commander of high mobility troops, and after Li defeated the Dangxiang tribal chieftain Gao Yu (高玉), he was given the honorary title of Tejin (特進) as well as honorary position as a minister.

Early in Emperor Daizong's Dali era (766–779), the subsequent military governor of Fengxiang, Li Baoyu, made Li Sheng the commander of his right wing troops. In 768, Tufan forces put Ling Prefecture (靈州, in modern Yinchuan, Ningxia) under siege. Li Baoyu gave Li Sheng 5,000 men to attack Tufan troops to try to alleviate the siege. Li Sheng declined—stating, "If I were going to use overwhelming power, 5,000 are not enough; if I were going to use strategies, 5,000 are too many." Instead, he took only 1,000 men and advanced out of Dazhen Pass (大震關, in modern Baoji) and attacked a Tufan garrison in Tao Prefecture, which had then been seized by Tufan; he slaughtered the Tufan garrison and burned the Tufan supplies stored there. When Tufan forces sieging Ling Prefecture heard the news, they lifted the siege and withdrew. For his contributions, he was given the honorary title of Kaifu Yitong Sansi (開府儀同三司). He was soon made the military commander under Ma Lin (馬璘) the military governor of Jingyuan Circuit (涇原, headquartered in modern Pingliang, Gansu), and on an occasion, after Ma was defeated by Tufan troops at Yancang (鹽倉, in modern Pingliang) and could not regroup to return to Jingyuan's capital Jing Prefecture, it was by Li Sheng's efforts that Ma's troops were able to fight past the Tufan troops back to Jing Prefecture. On account of this battle, Li was created the Prince of Hechuan. However, Ma was jealous of his battle prowess and displeased that he was not giving Ma proper respect, and therefore subsequently sent him to the capital Chang'an. Emperor Daizong kept Li at Chang'an to serve as a general of the Shence Army (神策軍), which was under direct imperial control.

== During Emperor Dezong's reign ==
=== Before Zhu Ci's rebellion ===
In 779, during the reign of Emperor Daizong's son Emperor Dezong, there was a joint Tufan and Nanzhao attack on Xichuan Circuit (西川, headquartered in modern Chengdu, Sichuan). Emperor Dezong sent Li Sheng and Qu Huan (曲環), commanding imperial guards and troops from several circuits, against Tufan and Nanzhao troops, defeating them and relieving Xichuan Circuit from attack.

In 781, after several circuits that had been de facto independent—Chengde (成德, headquartered in modern Shijiazhuang, Hebei), Weibo (魏博, headquartered in modern Handan, Hebei), Pinglu (平盧, headquartered in modern Tai'an, Shandong), and Shannan East (山南東道, headquartered in modern Xiangfan, Hubei)—took a defiant stand against the imperial government over Emperor Dezong's refusal to allow Chengde's military governor Li Baochen to be succeeded by his son Li Weiyue and Pinglu's military governor Li Zhengji to be succeeded by his son Li Na, Emperor Dezong sent Li Sheng, Ma Sui, and Li Baozhen (Li Baoyu's cousin) against Weibo's military governor Tian Yue, who was then sieging Linming (臨洺, in modern Handan), which was in Li Baozhen's Zhaoyi Circuit (昭義, headquartered in modern Changzhi, Shanxi). Their joint forces defeated Tian's, forcing Tian to withdraw back to Weibo's capital Wei Prefecture (魏州). However, the imperial troops' attacks stalemated and was additionally hampered by discord between Ma and Li Baozhen. Meanwhile, Li Weiyue's general Wang Wujun had killed Li Weiyue and submitted to imperial authority, but rebelled again, along with Zhu Tao, who had previously been loyal to the imperial government, over Emperor Dezong's failure to reward them as they believed they deserved. When Wang subsequently pressured Zhaoyi's Xing Prefecture (邢州, in modern Xingtai, Hebei), Li Baozhen sent some of his troops to defend Xing Prefecture—drawing Ma's ire in that Ma believed Li Baozhen was merely trying to preserve his own territory, to the point that Ma considered withdrawing entirely. Only with Li Sheng's intercession was the relationship between Ma and Li Baozhen restored. Subsequently, though, after imperial forces suffered a defeat at the hands of Zhu and Wang and were forced to lift the siege on Wei Prefecture in 782, Li Sheng took his troops and rendezvoused with the troops of Zhang Xiaozhong the military governor of Yiwu Circuit (義武, in modern Baoding, Hebei) to lift the siege that Wang Wujun's son Wang Shizhen had been laying against Zhao Prefecture (趙州, in modern Shijiazhuang), then held by a general loyal to the imperial government, Kang Rizhi (康日知). He and Zhang thereafter planned to attack Wang's headquarters at Heng Prefecture (恆州, in modern Shijiazhuang). In spring 783, he, along with Zhang's son Zhang Shengyun (張昇雲) attacked Zhu's officer Zheng Jingji (鄭景濟) at Qingyuan (清苑, in modern Baoding). This, however, drew a response from Zhu, who left Wei Prefecture and arrived at Qingyuan to battle Li Sheng. He defeated Li Sheng, forcing Li Sheng, who grew ill after the defeat, back to Yiwu's capital Ding Prefecture (定州).

=== During Zhu Ci's rebellion ===
In fall 783, Jingyuan troops, then at Chang'an to wait for deployment to the eastern battlefield, mutinied when Emperor Dezong did not give them sufficient rewards, forcing Emperor Dezong to flee to Fengtian (奉天, in modern Xianyang, Shaanxi). They supported Zhu Tao's brother Zhu Ci as their leader, and Zhu Ci soon declared himself the emperor of a new state of Qin and put Fengtian under siege. Li Sheng, upon his recovery later in the year, wanted to head immediately toward Fengtian to aid Emperor Dezong, but Zhang Xiaozhong, whose Yiwu Circuit was wedged between Zhu Tao's and Wang Wujun's territory and feared that he would be attacked, tried to keep Li Sheng at Yiwu. Only after Li Sheng bribed Zhang's subordinates with jade and also kept his son Li Ping (李憑) at Yiwu (to be married to Zhang's daughter) did Zhang agree to let Li Sheng depart, and he further had his subordinate Yang Rongguo (楊榮國) accompany Li Sheng to aid Emperor Dezong. Emperor Dezong gave Li Sheng the title of military governor of Shence Army. As he arrived in Chang'an's vicinity, however, with only 4,000 soldiers, he was not able to challenge Zhu's sieging army directly, and so stopped at the East Wei River Bridge (東渭橋) near Chang'an. It was said that because he was capable in leadership and in sharing the soldiers' difficulties, people were happy to follow him, and soon, with soldiers in Chang'an's vicinity joining him, his troops grew to 10,000.

The major general Li Huaiguang soon arrived and forced Zhu Ci to lift his siege on Fengtian. However, Emperor Dezong then alienated Li Huaiguang by refusing to meet him and instead ordering him to rendezvous with Li Sheng and two other military governors, Li Jianhui (李建徽) and Yang Huiyuan (楊惠元) in attacking Chang'an. When Li Huaiguang did rendezvous with Li Sheng, Li Jianhui, and Yang, he not only did not attack Chang'an, but simply halted at Xianyang (咸陽, in modern Xianyang). By spring 784, Li Sheng had begun to suspect Li Huaiguang's intentions and (correctly) believed that Li Huaiguang was in communications with Zhu Ci. He, fearing that Li Huaiguang would seize his troops, received permission from Emperor Dezong to return to East Wei River Bridge. He subsequently submitted a secret petition to Emperor Dezong urging Emperor Dezong to anticipate a rebellion by Li Huaiguang and keeping the path to the Hanzhong and Shu (蜀, i.e., Xichuan) region clear. Emperor Dezong hesitated and tried to calm Li Huaiguang to let Li Huaiguang remain in the imperial camp. Instead, Li Huaiguang publicly announced that he was rebelling, and Emperor Dezong fled to Liang Prefecture (梁州, in modern Hanzhong). Prior to fleeing, Emperor Dezong gave Li Sheng the honorary chancellor designation Tong Zhongshu Menxia Pingzhangshi (同中書門下平章事), effectively making Li Sheng the supreme commander of the troops in the Chang'an region still loyal to the imperial cause.

At that time, Li Sheng was effectively stuck with a small army between Zhu Ci and Li Huaiguang. He sent humble letters to Li Huaiguang urging Li Huaiguang to reconsider and again join the imperial cause, and while Li Huaiguang did not do so, he was sufficiently embarrassed that he did not attack Li Sheng. Soon, with a number of Li Huaiguang's subordinates defecting and accepting Li Sheng's orders, Li Huaiguang feared an attack from Li Sheng, and therefore withdrew from the region entirely, back to Hezhong (河中, in modern Yuncheng, Shanxi), leaving Li Sheng and his allies to face Zhu's state (which by that point had been renamed Han). Zhu Ci tried to persuade Li Sheng to join his cause by treating Li Sheng's relatives remaining in Chang'an with kindness, but Li Sheng was not swayed.

Soon, with Emperor Dezong sending the general Hun Jian toward Chang'an as well, Li Sheng prepared his assault against Chang'an. On June 12, 784, Li Sheng announced to his troops that the battle for Chang'an was to begin, and then began moving toward Chang'an, in coordination with Hun, Luo Yuanguang (駱元光), and Shang Kegu (尚可孤). Han troops made several attacks against his advancing troops but were defeated each time, and on June 19, Li Sheng entered Chang'an, forcing Zhu Ci to flee. (Zhu Ci was subsequently killed in flight by his own subordinates.)

=== After Zhu Ci's rebellion ===
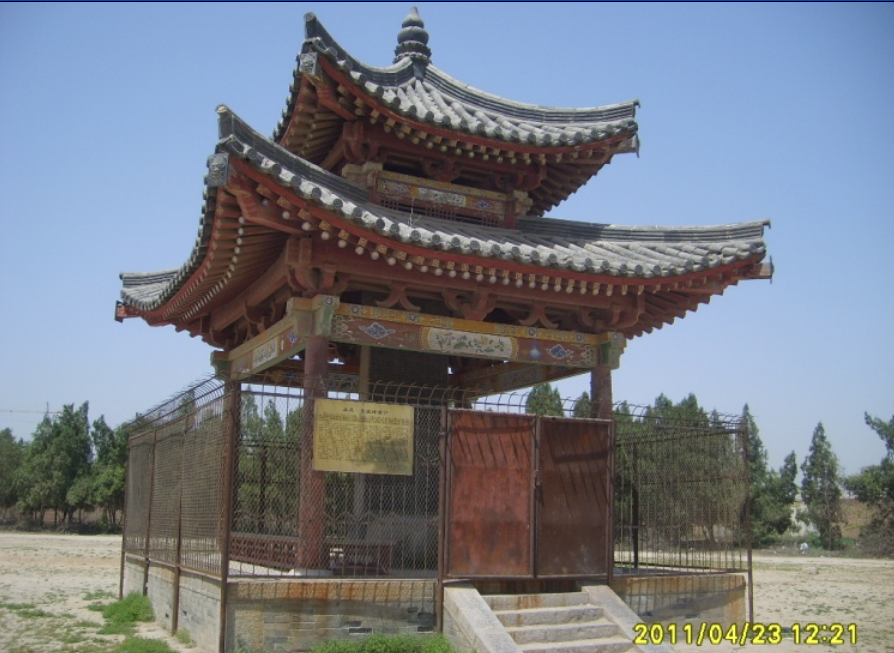
The Li Sheng Stele (李晟碑), erected in 839 to commemorate his victories against Zhu Ci, located in Gaoling County, Shaanxi

When Li Sheng's report of victory reached Emperor Dezong at Liang Prefecture, Emperor Dezong was touched and stated, "Heaven granted Li Sheng for the sake of the empire, not me." Li Sheng executed a number of Zhu Ci's officials and welcomed Emperor Dezong back to Chang'an. Emperor Dezong gave Li Sheng the honorary title of Situ (司徒, one of the Three Excellencies) and made him Zhongshu Ling (中書令), the head of the legislative bureau of government (中書省, Zhongshu Sheng), a post considered one for a chancellor.

After Emperor Dezong's return to Chang'an, he made Li Sheng the military governor of Fengxiang and Longyou (隴右, headquartered in modern Tianshui, Gansu) Circuits, stationed at Fengxiang to defend against Tufan attacks. He also created Li Sheng the Prince of Xiping. In the celebrations of the victory over Zhu, when Emperor Dezong was honoring the generals, Li Sheng was honored first, and Hun Jian was honored second. Subsequently, Li Sheng, after arriving at Fengxiang, executed a number of officers who had previously killed the former military governor Zhang Yi, to restore military discipline. Subsequently, in 785, when many officials suggested, in light of the imperial government's weakened state, that Emperor Dezong pardon Li Huaiguang, Li Sheng strenuously opposed, pointing out that there were five main reasons why Li Huaiguang could not be pardoned:

1. That, after the pardon, if a large army were posted between Chang'an and Hezhong, it would appear as the imperial government did not trust Li Huaiguang, but if a large army were not posted, Chang'an would be exposed to an attack by Li Huaiguang if Li Huaiguang turned against the imperial government again.
2. That, after the pardon, territory that the imperial troops had already captured from Li Huaiguang would have to be returned to Li Huaiguang, and there would be nothing left to reward Hun Jian and Kang Rizhi, to whom Emperor Dezong had already promised Li Huaiguang's territory.
3. That Tufan, Huige, and another rebel, Li Xilie, were all watching the imperial government's moves, and a pardon would show weakness.
4. That, after the pardon, Li Huaiguang's Shuofang Army soldiers would have to be rewarded for their contributions in lifting the siege on Fengtian, and the imperial treasury lacked the resources for such rewards.
5. That Hezhong lacked food at the time, and Li Huaiguang was close to defeat in any case.

Li Sheng further offered to attack Li Huaiguang himself without further supplies from the imperial treasury. Emperor Dezong thus ruled against pardoning Li Huaiguang, but did not accept Li Sheng's offer to attack Li Huaiguang himself, instead sending Hun and Ma Sui against Li Huaiguang. Li Huaiguang soon committed suicide under threat of impending attack from Ma and Hun, and his territory was reintegrated into imperial control.

Meanwhile, a past grudge that Li Sheng had with Zhang Yanshang, the military governor of Xichuan, began to affect Li Sheng's position at court. Previously, Li Sheng had, after his campaign against Tufan and Nanzhao at Xichuan, brought the military prostitute Gao Hong (高洪) with him. Zhang, angry with this, sent messengers to chase after Li Sheng's army to demand Gao back, thus causing a grudge between Li Sheng and Zhang. Late in 785, with the chancellor Liu Congyi ill, Emperor Dezong, who was happy with how Zhang had kept his court in exile well-supplied during the time he was at Liang Prefecture, considered making Zhang a chancellor. Li Sheng vehemently opposed and submitted a petition listing a number of Zhang's crimes. Emperor Dezong, not willing to go against Li Sheng at this point, still summoned Zhang back to Chang'an but only made him Zuo Pushe (左僕射), one of the heads of the executive bureau (尚書省, Shangshu Sheng), but not chancellor.

In 786, the Tufan chancellor Nanam Shang Gyaltsen Lhanang ("Shang Jiezan" (尚結贊) in Chinese), who believed that Li Sheng, Hun, and Ma were the only three people standing between him and a conquest of Tang, developed a strategy to create suspicions in Emperor Dezong's minds against the three. Thus, during a major incursion, he claimed to have been summoned by Li Sheng. Meanwhile, Li Sheng's son-in-law Zhang Yu (張彧), angry that Li Sheng held a grander ceremony for another daughter's marriage to Cui Shu (崔樞) than when Zhang and his wife married, joined Zhang Yanshang's party, as did another disgruntled former staffer of Li Sheng's, Zheng Yunkui (鄭雲逵). Zhang Yanshang used the opportunity of the Tufan invasion to alleged to Emperor Dezong that Li Sheng would commit treason, and Emperor Dezong, already suspicious of Li Sheng after his great accomplishments, began to believe the allegations, but when Li Sheng offered to resign, he refused. The chancellor Han Huang, who was friendly with Li Sheng, tried to mediate, and Han and the general Liu Xuanzuo (劉玄佐) held a feast for Li Sheng and Zhang Yanshang, hoping to dissolve their enmity. Both agreed, and Li Sheng further tried to dissolve Zhang Yanshang's resentment by endorsing him as chancellor. In spring 787, Emperor Dezong, accordingly, made Zhang Yanshang a chancellor. However, while Zhang Yanshang agreed to dissolve his resentment, the resentment persisted, and when Li Sheng requested that Zhang give a daughter to one of his sons in marriage, Zhang refused, causing Li Sheng to comment:

Military men are more straightforward. Once they release their resentment when drinking, they will no longer hold it in their chests. This is unlike civilians; even though, on the outside, there is resolution of anger, but the resentment remains inside. How can I not fear this?

Meanwhile, Shang continued his incursion, but by spring 787 was running into difficulties with the livestock of his army dying due to illnesses. He sought peace through Ma, but the peace proposal was opposed by Li Sheng and Han. Han soon died, however, and with Ma and Zhang both endorsing peace, Emperor Dezong agreed. He further used Li Sheng's opposition as excuse—stating that the peace with Tufan was beneficial to the empire despite Li Sheng's reservations—to remove Li Sheng from his command at Fengxiang, although he allowed Li Sheng to recommend his successor; Li Sheng recommended his officer Xing Junya (邢君牙). Emperor Dezong recalled Li Sheng to Chang'an to serve as Zhongshu Ling and Taiwei (太尉, also one of the Three Excellencies) and relieved him of all of his military duties. It was said that once Li Sheng returned to Chang'an, despite the suspicions that he was under, he nevertheless spoke honestly whenever he had opinions about the matters of state. In light of Zhang's involvement in Li Sheng's command being lifted, subsequently, when Zhang wanted Li Baozhen, and then Liu, to serve as the new commander of defense forces on the borders with Tufan, both Li Baozhen and Liu declined.

By summer 787, Emperor Dezong and Shang had negotiated a peace treaty, and Hun, as Emperor Dezong's emissary, was set to meet with Shang at Pingliangchuan (平涼川, in modern Pingliang). Li Sheng, fearing Tufan treachery, instructed Hun to be careful, but Zhang, hearing this, accused Li Sheng of interfering with the peace with Tufan. Emperor Dezong thus instructed Hun to be calm, not to aggravate Tufan in any way. On July 8, 787, at the meeting site, Shang laid a trap for Hun and launched a sudden attack, killing and capturing many of Hun's attendants, but Hun escaped. When the news reached Chang'an, Emperor Dezong was so panicked that he considered fleeing Chang'an, but remained due to Li Sheng's advice. As a result of this debacle, Zhang claimed an illness and retired, while Emperor Dezong recalled Ma to the capital and stripped him of his command.

Later in the year, Emperor Dezong made a respected senior advisor, Li Mi—who had previously served his grandfather Emperor Suzong and father Emperor Daizong but declined major offices—chancellor. At a meeting that Emperor Dezong hosted for Li Mi, with Liu Hun, Ma, and Li Sheng also present, Li Mi openly asked Emperor Dezong to guarantee Li Sheng's and Ma's personal safety, due to their great achievements. Emperor Dezong agreed. Later, when Li Mi advocated an alliance with Huige against Tufan, despite Emperor Dezong's longstanding hatred toward Huige—as, during an incident in 762 while he was still the Prince of Yong under Emperor Dezong, a number of his staff members had been arrested and killed by Huige's then-khan Dengli Khan Yaoluoge Yidijian (藥羅葛移地建) over a dispute in the meeting protocol between the young prince and the khan—Li Sheng and Ma spoke in favor of the alliance, finally persuading Emperor Dezong in conjunction with Li Mi's advice.

Li Sheng died in 793. Emperor Dezong publicly mourned him greatly, and, when new salt was presented later in the year from Yan Prefecture (鹽州, in modern Yulin, Shaanxi), which had just been newly recaptured from Tufan, Emperor Dezong, who awarded some of that new salt to the chancellors, also had the salt presented to Li Sheng's grave. Li Sheng's sons Li Yuan (李愿), Li Su (李愬), Li Ting (李聽), Li Xian (李憲), and nephew Wang Bi (王佖) all served as generals later.
