= Li Huaiguang =

Chinese Tang dynasty general and rebel (729-785)

Li Huaiguang (Chinese: 李懷光; 729 – September 19, 785) was a leading general of Mohe extraction of Tang China. He was credited with saving Emperor Dezong in the face of an attack by the rebel Zhu Ci in 783 but, dissatisfied with the lack of trust that Emperor Dezong displayed in him later, also rebelled, but his rebellion was stunted by the refusals of many of his subordinates to follow him. In 785, facing defeat by Tang imperial forces, he committed suicide.

== Background ==
Li Huaiguang was born in 729, during the reign of Emperor Xuanzong. His ancestors were Mohe from Balhae, and had originally been surnamed Ru (茹). Li Huaiguang's father was originally named Ru Chang (茹常), but due to his accomplishments while serving as a soldier at Shuofang Circuit (朔方, headquartered in modern Yinchuan, Ningxia), was given the imperial surname of Li and a new personal name of Jiaqing (嘉慶).

== Service under Guo Ziyi ==
Li Huaiguang started his military service when he was young, and he was known for his abilities in martial arts, his bravery, and his strength. He served under Guo Ziyi, who was then serving as the military governor (Jiedushi) of Shuofang Circuit and who respected him greatly. Early in the Shangyuan era (760–762) of Emperor Xuanzong's son Emperor Suzong, Li Huaiguang became a commander of Guo's guards. Sometime thereafter, he was made the discipline officer of the Shuofang army. During the meantime, for his accomplishments, he was also getting progressively greater honorary positions. It was said that as discipline officer, he was honest, hard-working, harsh, and fierce, and was willing to put people to death for their violation of military disciplines and did not spare his own friends and relatives. As Guo was himself lax toward his officers, he entrusted the matters of discipline to Li, and the army much feared Li.

In 763, during the reign of Emperor Suzong's son Emperor Daizong, by which time Pugu Huai'en had taken over the Shuofang army and was in a confrontational posture against the imperial government and another military governor, Xin Yunjing (辛雲京) the military governor of Hedong Circuit (河東, headquartered in modern Taiyuan, Shanxi), Pugu, who was then at Hezhong (河中, in modern Yuncheng, Shanxi), had a number of Shuofang officers take up strategic positions, and in these maneuvers, Li was stationed at Jin Prefecture (晉州, in modern Linfen, Shanxi). By 764, however, most of the Shuofang army had defected back to the imperial cause after Pugu formally rose against the imperial government, and Li was again under Guo's command. In 767, when Guo, under Emperor Daizong's instruction, made a sudden attack against the rebellious general Zhou Zhiguang (周智光), the military governor of Tonghua Circuit (同華, headquartered in modern Weinan, Shaanxi), Guo had Li and Hun Jian command the advance troops, although even before Li and Hun could attack, Zhou's own subordinates killed him and surrendered. During an incursion by the Tibetan Empire in 777, it was Li that Guo sent to repel the Tibetan troops.

In 777, Li briefly left military service to observe a mourning period for his mother. In 778, he was recalled to military service and commanded the forces of Bin (邠州, in modern Xianyang, Shaanxi), Ning (寧州), and Qing (慶州, both in modern Qingyang, Gansu) Prefectures, and he participated in repelling another Tibetan incursion. It was said that at this time, there was an incident during Guo's absence that Li wanted to forge an imperial edict to execute several senior officers, including Wen Ruya (溫儒雅). His plan, however, was thwarted by Guo's secretary Du Huangchang, who confronted him. Du instead sent a number of officers who were disciplinary issues away from the headquarters — perhaps including Li.

== As Tang Jiedushi ==
Emperor Daizong died in 779 and was succeeded by his son Emperor Dezong. Emperor Dezong, believing that Guo Ziyi was too lax and had too large of a responsibility area, honored Guo as Shangfu (尚父, "like an imperial father") but stripped him of his commands. He divided Guo's responsibility area among Li Huaiguang, Hun Jian, and Chang Qianguang (常謙光), making Li the military governor of Binning Circuit (邠寧, headquartered in modern Xianyang) as well as the mayor of Hezhong Municipality, governing seven prefectures. Initially, he had difficulty in getting some senior officers whose reputations matched his own — Shi Kang (史抗), Wen Ruya, Pang Xianhe (龐仙鶴), Zhang Xianming (張獻明), and Li Guangyi (李光逸) — to obey him. At the suggestion of the imperial eunuch sent to monitor his army, Zhai Wenxiu (翟文秀), he ordered them to report to the imperial guards at the capital Chang'an to serve as imperial guard officers, but as soon as they left Bin Prefecture he had them arrested and executed, blaming them for a defeat that Hun suffered when commanding them in 773.

In 780, after a plan by the powerful chancellor Yang Yan to build forts in the no man's land between Tang and Tibetan territory was opposed by Duan Xiushi the military governor of Jingyuan Circuit (涇原, headquartered in modern Pingliang, Gansu), Yang persuaded Emperor Dezong to strip Duan of his command and recall him. Emperor Dezong had Li assume the command of Jingyuan Circuit as well as Binning Circuit and moved his command to Jingyuan's capital Yuan Prefecture (原州). The Jingyuan soldiers feared Li's reputed harshness, particularly given his execution of the five Binning officers in 779. Duan's assistant Liu Wenxi (劉文喜) took this opportunity to seize the circuit and resist Li's commission, requesting that either Duan be returned to command or that another general, Zhu Ci, be put in command of the circuit. Emperor Dezong agreed with the latter request and gave the command of Jingyuan to Zhu instead. Liu subsequently resisted that move as well and sought aid from the Tibetan Empire. Emperor Dezong ordered Li and Zhu to attack him. Subsequently, Liu's own subordinates killed him and surrendered. In 781, Emperor Dezong gave Li the command of the previously pared-down Shuofang Circuit (which was given to Chang Qianguang in the 779 division) in addition to Binning.

In 782, with Tian Yue, Zhu Tao (Zhu Ci's brother), Wang Wujun, and Li Na resisting imperial authorities, Emperor Dezong ordered Li to take his Binning and Shuofang soldiers to attack Tian's Weibo Circuit (魏博, headquartered in modern Handan, Hebei). After Li Huaiguang arrived and joined forces with Ma Sui and Li Baozhen, Ma believed that they should wait and rest their soldiers before attacking, but Li Huaiguang advocated an immediate attack, and did so. He initially had successes against Zhu, but Wang took the opportunity to charge against his troops, cutting them off from each other, and eventually the imperial forces were routed. They were forced to lift their siege of Weibo's capital Wei Prefecture (魏州), but held their position in stalemate against the rebel forces. Emperor Dezong gave Li Huaiguang the honorary chancellor designation of Tong Zhongshu Menxia Pingzhangshi (同中書門下平章事). Subsequently, in light of their victory, the rebel leaders all declared themselves princes independent from Tang.

In fall 783, JIngyuan soldiers, then at Chang'an to be ready for deployment against the rebels in the east, mutinied when they were angry they did not get rewards. Emperor Dezong was forced to flee to Fengtian (奉天, in modern Xianyang), while the Jingyuan soldiers supported Zhu Ci as their leader, and Zhu Ci soon declared himself emperor of a new state of Qin. Upon the news arriving in the imperial camp at Wei Prefecture, Ma, Li Baozhen, and Li Qiu (李艽) withdrew to their own circuits, while Li Huaiguang, under the suggestion of his logistics officer Cui Zong (崔縱), decided to march as quickly as he could toward Chang'an to save Emperor Dezong. By the time that Li Huaiguang arrived in Chang'an's vicinity, Fengtian was under intense siege by Qin troops under Zhu Ci. Li Huaiguang sent his officer Zhang Shao (張韶) to Fengtian to inform Emperor Dezong of his impending arrival, and then attacked Qin forces at Liquan (醴泉, in modern Xianyang) and defeated them. When Zhu Ci heard the news, he, in fear, lifted the siege on Fengtian and withdrew back to Chang'an. It was believed at the time that Li Huaiguang arrived right on time and that, if he were even three days late, Fengtian would have fallen. After the victory, Emperor Dezong gave Li Huaiguang the title of Zhongshu Ling (中書令) — the head of the legislative bureau of government (中書省, Zhongshu Sheng) and a post considered one for a chancellor.

Meanwhile, though, it had become common knowledge that Li Huaiguang despised several officials that Emperor Dezong trusted — the chancellor Lu Qi and other ministers Zhao Zan (趙贊) and Bai Zhizhen (白志貞) — and that he would recommend to Emperor Dezong that those officials be removed. When Lu heard this, he believed that he had to prevent a meeting between Emperor Dezong and Li Huaiguang at all costs, and therefore suggested to Emperor Dezong order Li Huaiguang to attack Chang'an at once. Emperor Dezong agreed, and ordered Li Huaiguang to rendezvous with Li Sheng, Li Jianhui (李建徽), and Yang Huiyuan (楊惠元) to attack Chang'an. Li Huaiguang, angry that he was not even able to meet the emperor, began to resent Emperor Dezong. He stopped his army's movement and submitted petitions accusing Lu and the others of crimes and further accusing them of being responsible for the Jingyuan mutiny. Emperor Dezong was forced to demote and exile Lu, Bai, and Zhao. Li Huaiguang also submitted a petition accusing Zhai Wenxiu of crimes, and Emperor Dezong executed Zhai in response. Only after these events occurred did Li Huaiguang rendezvous with Li Sheng, Li Jianhui, and Yang, in spring 784. Meanwhile, when Emperor Dezong sought aid from the Tibetan Empire, the Tibetan chancellor Shang Jiezan (尚結贊) refused to launch forces unless he could get an explicit cosigning of the aid request by Li Huaiguang, citing the Tibetan Empire's own laws about how it would only launch troops in aid if the supreme commander of the state seeking aid also agreed with the aid request. Li Huaiguang was vehemently against seeking Tibetan aid, however, citing how Tibetan troops would surely pillage the region and also seek excessive rewards, and he refused to cosign the aid request, and Shang refused to launch aid troops. Emperor Dezong's trusted advisor Lu Zhi, believing Li Huaiguang to be on the verge of rebellion and fearing that Li Huaiguang would take over the troops under Li Sheng, Li Jianhui, and Yang, urged that those three armies be separated from Li Huaiguang's army and take up position elsewhere; Emperor Dezong repositioned Li Sheng, but believing that relocating Li Jianhui and Yang as well would bring further resentment from Li Huaiguang, did not move them.

Li Huaiguang, indeed, was then in secret communication with Zhu Ci and considering rebellion. Zhu promised Li Huaiguang that he would be willing to divide the realm into two, with both serving as emperors, and would be willing to honor Li Huaiguang like an older brother. Meanwhile, Li Sheng, believing Li Huaiguang to be ready to rebel, requested that precautions be made and that the road to the Hanzhong and Shu (蜀, modern Sichuan) regions be clear, in case of a Li Huaiguang rebellion. Emperor Dezong hesitated, and instead announced that he would go to Xianyang (咸陽, in modern Xianyang) to monitor the advancement of troops. Li Huaiguang, believing that the announcement was against him, further prepared for rebellion. Emperor Dezong, meanwhile, tried to calm Li Huaiguang by sending the official Li Bian (李卞) to award him with the title of Taiwei (太尉, one of the Three Excellencies) and an iron certificate (鐵劵, Tiejuan), which promised that he would never be executed. Li Huaiguang, believing that these were actually signs of distrust, threw the iron certificate onto the ground and stated:

The holy one [(i.e., Emperor Dezong)] is suspecting me. It is commonly said, "When a person is about to rebel, give him an iron certificate!" I am not planning to rebel, but giving me an iron certificate forces me to rebel.

When Li Bian returned to Fengtian and informed Emperor Dezong of these events, the officials at court began to prepare to evaluate Fengtian if necessary. Soon thereafter, Li Huaiguang made a surprise attack on Li Jianhui and Yang; Li Jianhui barely escaped with his life, while Yang was killed. Li Huaiguang thereafter made a declaration:

I am now making peace, in union with Zhu Ci. The Emperor should go far away!

On March 21, 784, with Li Huaiguang's declaration and posture of readiness to attack Fengtian, Emperor Dezong fled to Liang Prefecture (梁州, in modern Hanzhong).

== As rebel against Emperor Dezong ==
Li Huaiguang sent his officers Meng Bao (孟保), Hui Jingshou (惠靜壽), and Sun Fuda (孫福達) to chase after Emperor Dezong, but the three, not wanting to track down the emperor, intentionally slowed down, allowing Emperor Dezong to flee. Meanwhile, Li Sheng took a defensive posture and also wrote Li Huaiguang letters trying to persuade him to return to the imperial cause; while Li Huaiguang did not do so, he was sufficiently embarrassed and concerned that his soldiers would turn against him in an attack against Li Sheng that he did not attack Li Sheng. Meanwhile, a number of his subordinates, including Han Yougui (韓遊瓌), turned against him, weakening his army. As a result, Zhu Ci stopped treating him as an equal and instead was sending him edicts. His subordinate Li Jinglüe (李景略) tried to persuade him to attack Zhu Ci and resubmit to Tang, but under the suggestion of Yan Yan (閻晏), he decided to instead withdraw from the Chang'an region to Hezhong.

After Li Huaiguang's departure for Hezhong, Emperor Dezong issued an edict declaring his guilt, but also recounting his accomplishments and offering him the title of senior advisor to Emperor Dezong's son, Li Song the Crown Prince, but otherwise stripping him of his posts. The edict further offered Li Huaiguang's Shuofang army the option of deciding their next commander. The edict appeared to draw no reaction from Li Huaiguang.

In fall 784, after Li Sheng had destroyed Zhu's regime (which Zhu had renamed Han) and recaptured Chang'an, allowing Emperor Dezong to return to Chang'an, the imperial eunuch messenger Yin Yuanzhen (尹元貞) was able to persuade Li Huaiguang to resubmit to Emperor Dezong. He sent his son Li Wei to Chang'an to beg Emperor Dezong's forgiveness. Emperor Dezong thereafter sent the official Kong Chaofu (孔巢父) to Hezhong to accept his resubmission. When Kong arrived, Li Huaiguang changed into civilian clothing to show meekness and remorse, but Kong did not tell him to change back into official uniform. When Kong further asked the soldiers, "Who can succeed the Taiwei in commanding this army?" the soldiers were incensed, and they rushed and killed Kong and the eunuch Dan Shouying (啖守盈), with no intercession from Li Huaiguang, and Li Huaiguang thereafter again took a posture against the imperial troops. Emperor Dezong sent Hun Jian and Luo Yuanguang (駱元光) against Li Huaiguang, but they were stopped by Li Huaiguang's officer Xu Tingguang (徐庭光) at Changchun Palace (長春宮, in modern Weinan) and unable to advance. Meanwhile, though, Ma Sui was attacking Li Huaiguang's territory from the north and east and seizing Li Huaiguang's territory piece by piece.

In spring 785, Li Huaiguang's subordinate Lü Mingyue (呂鳴岳) was killed by Li Huaiguang after he discovered that Lü had been in secret communications with Ma. Li Huaiguang also put two other subordinates, Gao Ying and Li Yong, under arrest for associating with Lü. Meanwhile, Ma rendezvoused with Hun at Changchun Palace and put it under siege. By this point, the Shuofang soldiers were largely ready to turn against Li Huaiguang, and when Yan Yan tried to lead them against Han Yougui's Binning army — which was branched off the Shuofang army, and whose soldiers therefore mostly had family relationships with the Shuofang soldiers — the Shuofang soldiers refused to fight against Binning soldiers. Li Huaiguang declared to the soldiers that he was ready to resubmit to Tang and offer tributes to Emperor Dezong, but thereafter did nothing for another month. Meanwhile, as the Chang'an region lacked food, many officials suggested to Emperor Dezong that he pardon Li Huaiguang, but Li Sheng opposed, pointing out five reasons why pardoning Li Huaiguang would have undesirable effects, and Emperor Dezong agreed and did not pardon Li Huaiguang.

In fall 785, under Ma's persuasion, Xu surrendered Changchun Palace, allowing imperial troops to continue to advance to Hezhong. With Ma and Hun approaching Hezhong and Li Huaiguang's soldiers at Hezhong in a panic, Li Huaiguang committed suicide by hanging. His subordinate Niu Mingjun (牛名俊) cut off his head and surrendered. Li Wei killed his brothers and also committed suicide, leaving Li Huaiguang with no male-line progeny. Emperor Dezong, not knowing this at that time, issued an edict sparing Li Huaiguang's sons and granting a mansion to Li Huaiguang's wife Lady Wang, and returning Li Huaiguang's body to his family for proper burial. In 789, Emperor Dezong gave Li Huaiguang's grandson, by a daughter, Yan Baba (燕八八) the new name of Li Chengxu (李承緒) and had him serve as Li Huaiguang's progeny in supporting Lady Wang and worshipping Li Huaiguang.

== Notes and references ==
- Old Book of Tang, vol. 121.
- New Book of Tang, vol. 224, part 1.
- Zizhi Tongjian, vols. 223, 224, 225, 226, 227, 228, 229, 230, 231, 232.
