= Zhu Ci =

Chinese general and rebel during the Tang dynasty

- Reign: November 7, 783 – 784
- Born: 742
- Died: 784
Full name
- Family name: Zhū (朱); Given name: Cǐ (泚)
Era dates
- Yìngtiān (應天) 783-784; Tiānhuáng (天皇) 784
- Dynasty: initially Qin (秦), later changed to Han (漢) (changed in 784)
- Occupation: Military general, monarch, rebel

Zhu Ci (Chinese: 朱泚; 742–784) was a Chinese military general, monarch, and rebel during the Tang dynasty. He initially served as military governor (Jiedushi) of Lulong Circuit (盧龍, headquartered in modern Beijing), but later became a general for the imperial government. Resentful that he was removed from his command due to the rebellion by his brother Zhu Tao, when Emperor Dezong of Tang fled the capital Chang'an after a mutiny, Zhu Ci declared himself emperor of a new state of Qin (later changed to Han). He was defeated and forced to flee Chang'an in 784 and was killed in flight.

== Background ==
Zhu Ci was born in 742, during the reign of Emperor Xuanzong. His family was from You Prefecture (幽州, in modern Beijing). Both his great-grandfather Zhu Li (朱利) and grandfather Zhu Siming (朱思明) served as minor imperial officials. His father Zhu Huaigui (朱懷珪) served as an officer under Pei Kuan (裴寬) the military governor of Fanyang Circuit (范陽, headquartered at You Prefecture), commanding Pei's guards, and was given a general title. Zhu Huaigui later served as a general for the rebel Yan state after An Lushan, then the military governor of Fanyang, rebelled against Emperor Xuanzong's rule in 755. At the end of the rebellion, when the Yan general then in charge of Fanyang, Li Huaixian, submitted to the rule of Emperor Xuanzong's grandson Emperor Daizong, Li Huaixian made Zhu Huaigui the prefect of Ji Prefecture (薊州, in modern Tianjin), and Zhu Huaigui continued to serve under Li Huaixian until Zhu Huaigui's death in 766.

Zhu Ci himself was said to have started a military career in his youth on account of his father. He was strong and large in size, and he was capable in horsemanship, archery, and other military arts. He was said to appear lenient but actually stricter than he appeared. However, he was also said to be generous, and whenever he led a military mission, he would distribute the spoils to his subordinates. He was thus able to receive the support of his soldiers.

== Service under Li Huaixian and Zhu Xicai ==
Zhu Ci served under Li Huaixian as well, but in 768, he and his younger brother Zhu Tao, as well as a colleague, Zhu Xicai, plotted to kill Li. Under the plan, Zhu Ci and Zhu Tao arrived at Li's headquarters and killed the guards on the outside, but when Zhu Xicai did not then arrive with his troops to enter and kill Li, Zhu Ci became apprehensive and considered fleeing, staying only after Zhu Tao admonished, "If our plan fails, we will die anyway. Why bother fleeing?" Zhu Xicai soon arrived, and they entered, killed Li, and slaughtered his family. Zhu Xicai claimed the title of acting military governor. The imperial government, later in the year, acquiesced and made Zhu Xicai military governor. Zhu Ci continued to serve under Zhu Xicai, and it was said that because they shared the same surname, Zhu Xicai trusted him greatly.

Zhu Xicai, however, was said to be cruel and harsh, alienating his subordinates. In 772, Zhu Xicai's secretary Li Huaiyuan (李懷瑗), because the soldiers were angry at Zhu Xicai, assassinated him. Initially, the headquarters fell a state of confusion. Zhu Tao, who commanded the headquarters guards at the time, quickly induced his soldiers into proclaiming that the only person qualified to succeed as military governor was Zhu Ci. The other officers agreed, and Zhu Ci, who was then outside the circuit capital, was welcomed back to the capital to take over command. Zhu Ci claimed the title of acting military governor and sent messengers to the Tang capital Chang'an to report what had happened. Emperor Daizong made Zhu Ci the military governor and created him the Prince of Huaining.

== As Jiedushi of Lulong ==
At that time, the Tang western border was often subject to Tufan incursions, and the imperial governor regularly conscripted troops from the circuits to participate in defense in the fall — a season when Tufan often attacked. However, ever since the end of the Anshi Rebellion, Lulong Circuit had not submitted to such conscription. In 773, Zhu Ci, breaking that tradition and showing submission to the imperial government, sent Zhu Tao with 5,000 elite soldiers to Chang'an to participate in the fall defense. Emperor Daizong was very pleased, and he welcomed Zhu Tao in great feasts and gave him much reward.

Under Zhu Tao's subsequent suggestion—that going to Chang'an himself will show great faithfulness to the emperor—Zhu Ci himself offered to command the Lulong troops in fall defense in 774. Emperor Daizong agreed, and further built a large mansion for Zhu Ci in anticipation of his arrival. In fall 774, Zhu Ci, leaving Zhu Tao in acting command of Lulong, left Lulong and headed for Chang'an. When he got to Wei Prefecture (蔚州, in modern Zhangjiakou, Hebei), he grew ill. His subordinates requested that he return to Lulong and wait until his illness got better. Zhu Ci refused, stating, "Even if I die, continue on and carry my body to Chang'an." The subordinates did not dare to urge him otherwise any further. When he arrived at Chang'an, as he was the first military governor who had ever visited Chang'an from An Lushan's old territory since the Anshi Rebellion, the officials and people were lined up to welcome him, in such a massive display that it was said that they looked like long walls. Emperor Daizong invited Zhu Ci and his subordinates to a feast at Yanying Hall (延英殿), and it was said that Emperor Daizong gave him unprecedented rewards. For that fall, the fall defense troops were divided into four commands, between Zhu Ci and three other prominent generals, Guo Ziyi, Li Baoyu, and Ma Lin (馬璘).

== As imperial general and official ==
After Zhu Ci left Lulong, however, even though he remained military governor, Zhu Tao killed a number of his close associates, and the relationship between the brothers deteriorated. Zhu Ci, believing that it would not be safe for him to return to Lulong, requested to remain at Chang'an. Emperor Daizong agreed, but let him keep the title of military governor while making Zhu Tao acting military governor. In 775, Zhu Ci was put in charge of the defense post Fengtian (奉天, in modern Xianyang, Shaanxi), and in 776 was given the de jure chancellor designation of Tong Zhongshu Menxia Pingzhangshi (同中書門下平章事). He returned to Chang'an around the new year 778. He was soon given the additional title of military governor of Longyou Circuit (隴右, headquartered in modern Haidong Prefecture, Qinghai) -- which had fallen to Tufan and thus was a largely honorary title—and was given the command of the armies originally sent from Hexi (河西, headquartered in modern Wuwei, Gansu, which had also fallen to Tufan since their departure) and Zelu (澤潞, headquartered in modern Changzhi, Shanxi) Circuits. In 778, he submitted to Emperor Daizong what he thought to be a sign of fortune—a mouse living peacefully with a cat and her kittens. Chang considered this a sign of fortune and congratulated Emperor Daizong, but Chang's subordinate Cui Youfu, who was serving as Zhongshu Sheren (中書舍人, a mid-level official at the legislative bureau of government (中書省, Zhongshu Sheng)) disagreed, argued that this was against the cat's nature and was a sign that officials were not carrying out their responsibilities. Later in the year, when there was a Tufan incursion, Zhu Ci commanded soldiers in defending against the incursion, along with Guo Ziyi and Duan Xiushi. In 779, his noble title was changed from Prince of Huaining to Prince of Suining.

Later in 779, Emperor Daizong died and was succeeded by his son Emperor Dezong. In the aftermaths of Emperor Daizong's death, Chang and Cui had a major dispute over the proper period for the officials to wear mourning clothes for Emperor Daizong—whether they should wear mourning clothes for only three days (as per Emperor Daizong's will), which Cui advocated, or 27 days (the same length as Emperor Dezong himself were to do so), as Chang advocated. Chang became sufficiently angry that he submitted a petition—signing Guo's and Zhu Ci's names as per customs of one chancellor signing petitions on behalf of other chancellors as well—requesting that Cui be punished for his insolence. Emperor Dezong initially ordered that Cui be demoted to be the deputy mayor of the eastern capital Luoyang. When this demotion was announced, however, both Guo and Zhu Ci submitted petitions in Cui's defense. Emperor Dezong summoned both of them, asking why they submitted inconsistent petitions—one seeking Cui's punishment and one defending him—and both of them stated that they did not know about the petition seeking punishment. Emperor Dezong, who did not know that it was customary for chancellors to sign petitions for each other, believed Chang to have forged Guo's and Zhu's signatures, and, in anger, demoted Chang to be the prefect of the distant Chao Prefecture (潮州, roughly modern Chaozhou, Guangdong) and made Cui chancellor. Subsequently, Zhu's defense post was moved to Fengxiang (鳳翔, in modern Baoji, Shaanxi), and he was made the mayor of Fengxiang Municipality.

In 780, Yang Yan, then the most powerful chancellor in Emperor Dezong's administration, wanted to rebuild Yuan Prefecture (原州, in modern Guyuan, Gansu) -- which was formerly Tang territory but since then had become part of the no-man's land between Tang and Tufan—to serve as a forward advance post, and Yang was so intent on the project that when Duan Xiushi opposed, he had Duan removed from his post as military governor of Jingyuan Circuit (涇原, headquartered in modern Pingliang, Gansu) and replaced him with Li Huaiguang—a general known for his strictness and harshness. He subsequently ordered Li Huaiguang, Cui Ning, and Zhu to command troops in the construction project. Duan's former subordinate Liu Wenxi (劉文喜), knowing that the Jingyuan troops feared Li Huaiguang, rose in rebellion and submitted a petition ostensibly requesting that Duan be returned or, in the alternative, Zhu be made military governor. Emperor Dezong initially tried to placate Liu by in fact naming Zhu the military governor of Jingyuan, but Liu, who actually wanted the circuit himself, refused to welcome Zhu and sought aid from Tufan. Emperor Dezong ordered Li Huaiguang and Zhu to attack Liu. Zhu put Jing Prefecture (the capital of Jingyuan Circuit) under siege, and, with Tufan refusing to aid Liu Wenxi, Liu Wenxi's subordinate Liu Haibin (劉海賓) killed Liu Wenxi and surrendered. Subsequently, Emperor Dezong gave Zhu the greater chancellor title of Zhongshu Ling (中書令), making him titularly the head of the legislative bureau.

== Rebellion ==
In 782, Zhu Tao, angry that he was not given part of Chengde Circuit (成德, headquartered in modern Shijiazhuang, Hebei) after he, pursuant to imperial orders, had participated in the campaign that led to the death of Li Weiyue and had, briefly, returned Chengde to imperial control, rebelled against Emperor Dezong. He went secret letters to Zhu Ci asking Zhu Ci to rebel as well. The letters, however, were intercepted by imperial forces and never reached Zhu Ci. Emperor Dezong, upon reviewing the letters, recalled Zhu Ci to Chang'an and showed him the letters. Zhu, in fear, begged forgiveness. Emperor Dezong responded, "You are thousands of li away from each other, and it is clear that you did not join his plot. This is no sin of yours." Despite this assurance, however, Emperor Dezong, while permitting Zhu to retain all of his titles, did not permit him to return to Fengxiang. Instead, he kept Zhu at Chang'an, although he gave him a great mansion, fields, and treasures, hoping to placate him.

On November 2, 783, Jingyuan soldiers, who had been summoned to Chang'an in preparation for deployment to the wars in the east (against rebellious military governors Zhu Tao, Wang Wujun, Li Na, and Tian Yue), were angered by a lack of rewards they were promised, and they mutinied and attacked the palace, defying their own commander Yao Lingyan (姚令言). Emperor Dezong fled to Fengtian. The soldiers decided to welcome Zhu Ci from his mansion and install him as their leader. That night, Zhu moved into the palace and originally declared himself acting commander of the armed forces. The next day, he issued a declaration that appeared to show intent to welcome Emperor Dezong back to Chang'an:

Jingyuan soldiers had long been on the border and not familiar with proper etiquette. They thus surprised the Emperor in the palace and shocked him into surveying to the west. The Taiwei [(太尉, one of the Three Excellencies and one of the honorary titles that Zhu carried)] has temporarily taken command of the armed forces. All of the Shence Army [(神策軍, an arm of the Tang imperial guards that directly served the imperial government)] soldiers and officials with offices and salaries should report to the Emperor's location. Those who cannot report to the Emperor's location should report to their offices. In three days, anyone who has reported to neither place will be beheaded.

The declaration had the effect of causing officials to come out of hiding and report to Zhu. Some suggested to Zhu that he welcome Emperor Dezong back to Chang'an—which visibly displeased him. Seeing this, some of the officials loyal to Emperor Dezong began to flee. Meanwhile, the official Yuan Xiu (源休), who believed himself to be highly capable but who had been blocked off from becoming chancellor by Emperor Dezong's trusted chancellor Lu Qi, became a chief strategist for Zhu, and he suggested that Zhu take the throne himself. Also becoming close associates of Zhu were the chancellor Li Zhongchen and the minister Zhang Guangsheng (張光晟). Yao also joined Zhu's party. Meanwhile, believing that Duan Xiushi would be similarly disaffected, Zhu also summoned him and made him a member of this inner circle or cabal, although Duan was secretly plotting to assassinate Zhu and welcome Emperor Dezong back to Chang'an.

Wanting to eliminate Emperor Dezong as a threat, Zhu commissioned Yao's subordinate Han Min (韓旻) with 3,000 soldiers to head to Fengtian—ostensibly to welcome Emperor Dezong back to Chang'an, but instead with instruction to launch a surprise attack. After Han's departure, Duan had his associate Qi Lingyue (岐靈岳) forge an order from Yao ordering Han to return to Chang'an, thus aborting the attack. Meanwhile, Zhu had convened a meeting with Li Zhongchen, Yuan, Yao, and Duan, to discuss plans for him to take the throne. At the meeting, Duan tried to assassinate Zhu, but failed. Duan was killed by Zhu's guards despite Zhu's attempt to spare him. On November 6, Zhu declared himself the emperor of a new state of Qin. He made Yao, Li Zhongchen, and Yuan his chancellors, and Zhu Tao crown prince.

== As emperor ==
Zhu Ci made it a priority to capture Fengtian to extinguish the hopes of Emperor Dezong's being restored. He left Li Zhongchen and Qiu Jingzhong (仇敬忠) in charge of Chang'an, and personally led his army, assisted by Yao Lingyan and Zhang Guangsheng, to Fengtian. He put Fengtian under siege, and despite the efforts of the Tang generals Hang Yougui (韓遊瓌) and Hun Jian in fighting off the Qin siege, Fengtian was soon in a desperate state, with its food supplies cut off. Tang resistance forces were then harassing the Qin forces left at Chang'an, and in response, Zhu intensified his siege of Fengtian. However, after Fengtian was under siege for more than a month, Li Huaiguang, who had been fighting Wang Wujun and Tian Yue to the east but immediately headed toward Chang'an upon hearing of Emperor Dezong's plight, arrived with his elite Shuofang Army. On December 18, with Li Huaiguang not quite yet at Fengtian but having defeated Qin forces at Liquan (醴泉, in modern Xianyang), Zhu, fearful that he would be defeated by Li Huaiguang, lifted Fengtian's siege and returned to Chang'an. He would not threaten Fengtian again, although he tried to keep the morale of his forces in check at Chang'an by periodically spreading rumors that Fengtian had fallen. By this point, however, it was said that he controlled little more than Chang'an itself. It was the consensus at the time that if Li Huaiguang had arrived three days later than he actually did, Fengtian would have fallen.

On January 27, 784, apparently trying to change his fortune, Zhu changed the name of his state to Han. At Yuan Xiu's suggestion, he slaughtered a large number of Emperor Dezong's imperial clan and other relatives, but he refused suggestions to force Tang officials into serving him and to destroy the Tang imperial temples. Meanwhile, Emperor Dezong, believing that he needed to pacify all of the other warlords who had turned against him, issued a general pardon that included even Zhu Tao, although Zhu Ci was excluded from the general pardon. (In response, Wang Wujun, Li Na, and Tian Yue all gave up independent princely titles they had claimed for themselves and nominally submitted to Tang rule again, although neither Zhu Tao nor another military governor who had rebelled, Li Xilie, did so, and Li Xilie soon declared himself emperor of his own state of Chu.)

Meanwhile, though, Tang efforts to recapture Chang'an soon fell victim to infighting—as Li Huaiguang, who had saved Emperor Dezong, was angered when Emperor Dezong refused to meet him and instead ordered him to attack Chang'an immediately, along with Li Sheng and several other generals. (Emperor Dezong had done so at Lu Qi's suggestion—as Lu feared that if Emperor Dezong met Li Huaiguang, given Li Huaiguang's achievements, Emperor Dezong would accept Li Huaiguang's opinion that Lu and his associates Zhao Zan (趙贊) and Bai Zhizhen (白志貞) were responsible for the calamity.) Li Huaiguang sent repeated accusations to Emperor Dezong, forcing him to demote Lu, Zhao, and Bai, but even after the demotions had occurred, only slowly advanced toward Chang'an. Zhu, seeing that Li Huaiguang was disaffected, sent secret messengers to Li Huaiguang, offering to honor Li Huaiguang as an older brother, with both of them serving as emperors of their own independent realms. Li Huaiguang thus turned against Emperor Dezong—seizing the armies of the generals Li Jianhui (李建徽) and Yang Huiyuan (楊惠元), and publicly declaring that he was now in peaceful relations with Zhu and that Emperor Dezong should flee. Emperor Dezong, fearing the consequences of a joint attack by Li Huaiguang and Zhu, fled to Xingyuan (興元, in modern Hanzhong, Shaanxi). In light of Emperor Dezong's flight, a number of Tang officials who had previously refused to submit to Zhu, including the former chancellor Qiao Lin, came out of hiding and joined Zhu's administration. Meanwhile, though, after Li Huaiguang publicly broke with Emperor Dezong, many of Li Huaiguang's subordinates rose against him, weakening his army substantially. Zhu then turned against Li Huaiguang as well—no longer honoring him as an older brother, but treating him as a subject. Li Huaiguang, in anger and in fear that Li Sheng would attack him, withdrew from the Chang'an region entirely, taking up position at Hezhong (河中, in modern Yuncheng, Shanxi). Zhu also tried to turn Li Sheng's allegiance by treating the family members of not only Li Sheng but his soldiers who remained at Chang'an well, but Li Sheng rejected his overtures. Soon, Hun Jian arrived as well, and he and Li Sheng prepared an assault on Chang'an. When Tufan forces, whom Emperor Dezong had sought help from, arrived as well, however, Zhu was able to persuade them to depart by bribing them.

On June 12, 784, Li Sheng declared that the assault against Chang'an would be starting, and advanced into Chang'an's vicinity. On June 18, the Han generals Zhang Tingzhi (張庭芝) and Li Xiqian (李希倩, Li Xilie's brother) tried to preempt Li Sheng by attacking him, and Li Sheng defeated them. Zhang Guangsheng, who had been in secret contact with Li Sheng, then persuaded Zhu to flee Chang'an. Zhu did so on June 20, and Li Sheng entered Chang'an, reclaiming it for Tang.

Zhu decided to flee to Tufan. On the way, when he went past Jing Prefecture (the capital of Jingyuan Circuit), Tian Xijian (田希鑒), a general who had submitted to Zhu who was in control of Jingyuan Circuit, turned against him and refused to welcome him. Zhu, in anger, attacked Jing Prefecture but could not capture it. The Jingyuan soldiers in Zhu's army killed Yao Lingyan and surrendered to Tian. Zhu, with only his Lulong troops continuing with him, continued to flee. When he reached Pengyuan (彭原, in modern Qingyang, Gansu), his subordinate Liang Tingfen (梁庭芬) suddenly hit him with an arrow, causing him to fall into a ditch. Han Min then beheaded Zhu and surrendered to Tang forces.

== Notes ==
Regnal titles
| Preceded by Emperor Dezong of Tang | Emperor of China (Chang'an region); 783–784 | Succeeded by Emperor Dezong of Tang |
