= Cui Yuan (705–768) =

Chinese politician

Cui Yuan (崔圓) (705 – 16 July 768), courtesy name Youyu (有裕), formally Duke Zhaoxiang of Zhao (趙昭襄公), was a Chinese politician during the Tang dynasty, serving as a chancellor during the reigns of Emperor Xuanzong and Emperor Suzong.

== Background ==
Cui Yuan was born in 704, during the reign of Wu Zetian. His family was from Bei Prefecture (貝州, in modern Xingtai, Hebei), was from the "Qingzhou branch of Qinghe " of the prominent Cui clan of Qinghe. His grandfather Cui Zhengu (崔貞固) served as a county secretary general for the Tang dynasty, and his father Cui JIngzhi (崔景晊) served as a judge of the supreme court. Cui Yuan lost his father when he was young, and he was said to be poor but having great ambitions, studying military strategies fervently.

== During Emperor Xuanzong's reign ==
During the Kaiyuan era (713-741) of Emperor Xuanzong, Emperor Xuanzong held a special imperial examination for those who might have missed out on regular examinations. Cui Yuan received a high score on military strategy, and was made a military officer—but as he was proud of his literary abilities, he was not pleased with the commission. When he later served under Xiao Jiong (蕭炅) the mayor of Jingzhao Municipality (京兆府, encompassing the capital Chang'an), however, Xiao recommended him, and he was made the secretary general of Huichang County. He was later promoted to be Sixun Yuanwailang (司勳員外郎), a low-level official at the ministry of civil service affairs. In 752, when the chancellor Yang Guozhong became also the military governor (jiedushi) of Jiannan Circuit (劍南, headquartered in modern Chengdu, Sichuan), Yang invited him to serve on staff, and he became the military advisor to the governor of Shu Commandery (蜀郡, i.e., Chengdu) and acting military governor, in Yang's absence.

After the military governor An Lushan rebelled in 755, Yang considered the possibility that the emperor might have to flee to Jiannan, and secretly instructed Cui to begin preparing for such a plan. In 756, as An's forces approached Chang'an, the plan was carried out, as Emperor Xuanzong began the flight to Jiannan—although, on the way, Yang was killed by angry imperial guard soldiers. Once Emperor Xuanzong's train reached Hechi Commandery (河池, in modern Baoji, Shaanxi), Cui's messenger arrived there as well to welcome Emperor Xuanzong and to point out that Jiannan was well-supplied. Emperor Xuanzong promoted Cui to be Zhongshu Shilang (中書侍郎), the deputy head of the legislative bureau of government (中書省, Zhongshu Sheng), and gave him the designation Tong Zhongshu Menxia Pingzhangshi (同中書門下平章事), making him a chancellor de facto. Subsequently, when Emperor Xuanzong sent his son Li Jiao (李璷) the Prince of Ying to Jiannan first to survey the circuit, Li Jiao was not respectful of Cui, and Emperor Xuanzong, in order to placate Cui, recalled Li Jiao.

== During Emperor Suzong's reign ==
Meanwhile, though, Emperor Xuanzong's crown prince Li Heng, who did not follow Emperor Xuanzong toward Jiannan, had declared himself emperor (as Emperor Suzong) at Lingwu. When Emperor Xuanzong received news of this, he acknowledged Emperor Suzong as emperor, taking the title Taishang Huang (retired emperor) instead. He also sent three of the four chancellors he commissioned -- Wei Jiansu, Fang Guan, and Cui Huan to Lingwu to formally invest Emperor Suzong as emperor, but kept Cui Yuan at Shu Commandery for some time, until spring 757, when he also sent Cui Yuan to join Emperor Suzong, then at Pengyuan (彭原, in modern Qingyang, Gansu). In order to show favor to Cui, however, Emperor Xuanzong erected a monument at Shu Commandery to commemorate his accomplishments. Initially, it was expected that Emperor Suzong would not favor him, and Emperor Suzong did not meet him for several days even after he arrived at Pengyuan; only after he had bribed one of Emperor Suzong's close associates, the eunuch Li Fuguo, was he able to meet Emperor Suzong.

In 758, after Emperor Suzong had recaptured Chang'an, and both Emperors Xuanzong and Suzong had returned there, Cui was created the Duke of Zhao but was removed from his chancellor post and became an advisor to the crown prince. He was put in charge of the eastern capital Luoyang, which An Lushan's son and successor An Qingxu had just abandoned. In spring 759, however, after Tang forces fighting An Qingxu and Shi Siming collapsed at Yecheng, the officials and the people of Luoyang panicked and fled Luoyang, with Cui fleeing as far Xiangyang. Afterwards, he submitted a petition asking for punishment, and Emperor Suzong stripped him of his fief and his honorary title as Kaifu Yitong Sansi (開府儀同三司). He was soon made the teacher of Emperor Suzong's brother Li Huan (李環) the Prince of Ji. Then, at the recommendation of the general Li Guangbi, he was made the prefect of Huai Prefecture (懷州, roughly modern Jiaozuo, Henan) and later the prefect of Fen Prefecture (汾州, roughly modern Linfen, Shanxi), having good reputation at both places. As of 761, Cui was the military governor of Huainan Circuit (淮南, headquartered in modern Yangzhou, Jiangsu). He remained there until his death in July 768. He was given posthumous honors.

== Notes and references ==
- Old Book of Tang, vol.108.
- New Book of Tang, vol.140.
- Zizhi Tongjian, vols. 216, 217, 218, 219, 220, 221, 222, 224.
