= Pei Mian =

Chinese politician

Pei Mian (Chinese: 裴冕; died January 5, 770), courtesy name Zhangfu (章甫), formally the Duke of Ji (冀公), was a Chinese politician during the Tang dynasty, serving as a chancellor during the reigns of Emperor Suzong and Emperor Daizong. He was known for his faithfulness to Tang during the difficult times of An Lushan Rebellion, but was also looked down upon by historians for his material greed.

== Background ==
It is not known when Pei Mian was born. He was from a prominent clan of Hedong (河東, in modern Yuncheng, Shanxi), which traced its ancestry to officials of Han dynasty, Cao Wei, Jin dynasty (266–420), Former Yan, Later Qin, Northern Wei, and Tang dynasty. His grandfather Wei Zhi (韋陟) served as a military advisor to a prefectural prefect, and his father Wei Ji (韋紀) served as the secretary general for Chang'an County, one of the two counties making up the Tang capital Chang'an.

== During Emperor Xuanzong's reign ==
Early in Emperor Xuanzong's Tianbao era (742–756), because of his ancestors' status as imperial officials, Pei Mian was made the sheriff of Weinan County (in modern Weinan, Shaanxi), and he became known for his administrative abilities. When Wang Hong (王鉷) the chief imperial censor took on the additional post as the surveyor of the Chang'an region, he made Pei his assistant. Pei later served as an imperial censor, initially with the low rank of Jiancha Yushi (監察御史), then the higher rank of Dianzhong Shi Yushi (殿中侍御史). It was said that while Pei was not well-learned, he was diligent, responsible, and decisive, and Wang much depended on him. In 752, when Wang Hong was implicated in a coup plot of his brother Wang Han (王銲) and was forced to commit suicide, his several hundred subordinates did not dare to even approach Wang Hong's door, except for Pei, who personally took Wang Hong's body and buried it properly. He became renowned for this, and in 753, Geshu Han, the military governor (jiedushi) of Hexi Circuit (河西, headquartered in modern Wuwei, Gansu) invited him to serve as an officer below Geshu.

== During Emperor Suzong's reign ==
In 755, the military governor An Lushan rebelled, and by 756 had established a new state of Yan. Further, Yan forces were approaching Chang'an, forcing Emperor Xuanzong to flee toward Shu Commandery (蜀郡, roughly modern Chengdu, Sichuan). Emperor Xuanzong's son, Li Heng the Crown Prince, however, did not follow Emperor Xuanzong and instead headed toward the important military outpost Lingwu. Meanwhile, Pei, who had received a recall to serve as deputy chief imperial censor (御史中丞, Yushi Zhongcheng), encountered Li Heng at Pingliang and accompanied Li Heng to Lingwu. Subsequently, at the urging of Pei and Du Hongjian, Li Heng declared himself emperor there (as Emperor Suzong)—an act that Emperor Xuanzong would recognize when the news reached him later. Emperor Suzong made Pei Zhongshu Shilang (中書侍郎), the deputy head of the legislative bureau of government (中書省), and gave him the designation Tong Zhongshu Menxia Pingzhangshi (同中書門下平章事), making him a chancellor de facto.

It was said that Pei was faithful and diligent as chancellor, and received the support of the people. However, it was also said that he was not wise, and, believing that it was necessary to gather money for government use, advocated selling government offices for money, and also letting people become Buddhist and Taoist monks and use them to gather more money. As a result, political honors became worthless. After Emperor Suzong, gradually advancing back toward Chang'an, moved to Fengxiang (鳳翔, in modern Baoji, Shaanxi) in spring 757, Pei was made You Pushe (右僕射), one of the heads of the executive bureau (尚書省, Shangshu Sheng), and no longer chancellor. In fall 757, when Tang and Huige forces recaptured Chang'an, it was Pei that Emperor Suzong sent to Chang'an to comfort the people and to offer sacrifices to the imperial ancestral temple. Emperor Suzong created him the Duke of Ji. In 758, when Emperor Xuanzong gave his daughter Princess Ningguo in marriage to Huige's Bayanchur Khan, Pei was sent to escort Princess Ningguo to the border, although not to Huige headquarters. Pei was subsequently made the mayor of Chengdu Municipality and the military governor of Xichuan Circuit (西川, headquartered in Chengdu), although he was later recalled to again be You Pushe. In 761, when the powerful eunuch Li Fuguo wanted to be chancellor, and Emperor Suzong, who by this point was fearful of Li Fuguo, refused on the basis that he did not have the support of the officials, Li Fuguo tried to persuade Pei to recommend him. Emperor Suzong told the chancellor Xiao Hua that if an important official (i.e., someone like Pei) recommended Li Fuguo, he would no longer have the excuse to refuse Li Fuguo's request. When Xiao subsequently discussed this with Pei, Pei's response was:

Surely I will not do this. My arm can be cut off before he can be chancellor.

Subsequently, Li Fuguo was not able to be chancellor while Emperor Suzong was alive, much to Li Fuguo's resentment.

== During Emperor Daizong's reign ==
In 762, Emperor Suzong died. After a power struggle between Emperor Suzong's wife Empress Zhang and Li Fuguo, Li Fuguo prevailed and killed Empress Zhang, and subsequently supported Emperor Suzong's crown prince Li Yu as emperor (as Emperor Daizong). Meanwhile, Pei Mian was put in charge of building an imperial tomb for Emperor Suzong, and, in order to ingratiate Li Fuguo, made Li Fuguo's close associate Liu Xuan (劉烜) his assistant. After Li Fuguo was removed in 762, Pei had disagreements with the newly powerful eunuch Cheng Yuanzhen, and thus was demoted to be the prefect of Shi Prefecture (施州, roughly modern Enshi Tujia and Miao Autonomous Prefecture, Hubei). Several months later, he was moved to be the prefect of Li Prefecture (澧州, roughly Changde, Hunan), and eventually was recalled to be Zuo Puye (左僕射), the other head of the executive bureau.

By 769, the chancellor Yuan Zai was the most powerful figure at court. Yuan was grateful to Pei for having recommended him in the past, and therefore, when Du Hongjian, who was then chancellor, died that year, Yuan recommended Pei to again be chancellor both to repay Yuan and to further control the government in light of Pei's old age and illness. When Pei was receiving his commission as chancellor, pursuant to customs, he was dancing to show gratefulness to the emperor, but as he danced, he fell to the ground, and Yuan had to help him up and to give thanks on his behalf. Pei died around the new year 770 and was posthumously honored. Emperor Daizong further had an award of silk and grain sent to his family. However, no posthumous name was recorded for him.

It was said that Pei, despite his faithfulness, was also known for wastefulness, spending much resources on his wagons, his clothes, his food, and his horses. He invented a form of headdress that was imitated by others and which became known as Puye Form (僕射樣). When he succeeded Du as chancellor, his subordinate reported to him the amount of additional salary he would be earning, and he was pleased with the earning, drawing scorn from those who saw him.

== Notes and references ==
- Old Book of Tang, vol. 113.
- New Book of Tang, vol. 140.
- Zizhi Tongjian, vols. 216, 218, 219, 220, 222, 223, 224.
