= Sack of Guangzhou (758) =

Abbasid victory in the An Lushan rebellion

- Part of The An Lushan rebellion
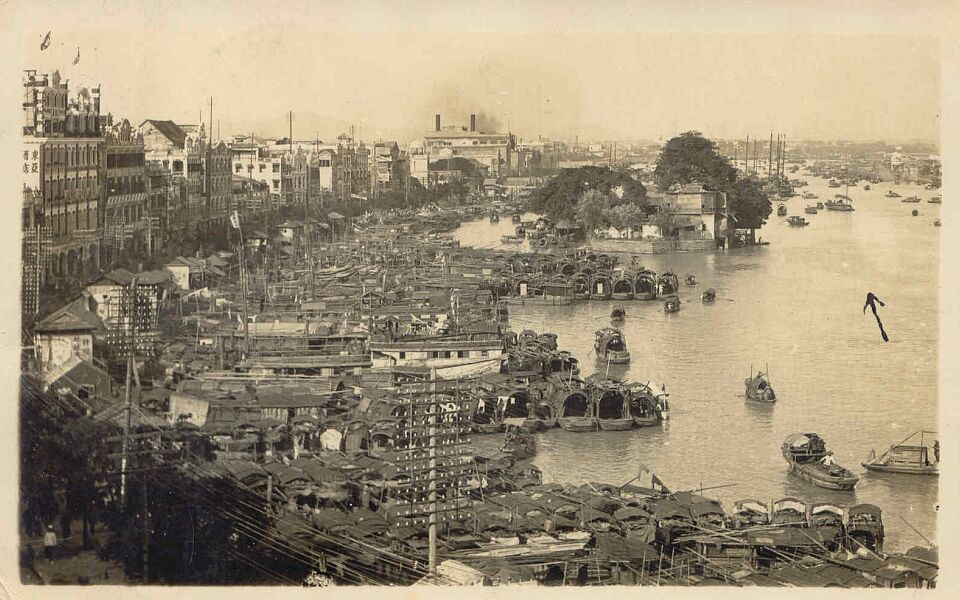
- A port in Guangzhou
Date	758 CE
Location	Guangzhou
Result	Razing of Guangzhou

Belligerents
Arab and Persian fleets (Note: Most likely troops that originated from the Abbasid Caliphate. See article for more details.)	Tang dynasty

Commanders and leaders
Unknown	Wei Lijian (AWOL)

Casualties and losses
- Guangzhou sacked and burned

The Sack of Guangzhou was a seaborne attack on the port city of Guangzhou in the Tang Empire by Arab and persian forces in late September 758 CE, during Emperor Suzong's reign. The attackers plundered and burned the city, including its warehouses and storehouses, and departed by sea after the city's governor, Wei Lijian, abandoned his post and fled into hiding.

The reasons behind the raid remain unclear, though several possibilities have been suggested. The theory states that the attackers started as soldiers that were sent by the Abbasid Caliph to suppress a rebellion in Transoxania, and they reached China's coastline to attack Guangzhou. Another explanation points to the mistreatment of foreigners and Arab merchants trading in Guangzhou, which caused a major crisis in 758. The attackers may have been traders who became enraged about official corruption and trade problems. This led them to destroy warehouses according to historical records that show foreign merchants faced high costs in the city.
