= Li Chongjun =

Crown prince of the Tang dynasty

- Died: 7 August 707
- Spouse: Lady Yang
- Issue: Li Zonghui, Prince of Huyang
Posthumous name
- Crown Prince Jiemin (節愍太子)
- Father: Emperor Zhongzong of Tang

Li Chongjun (Chinese: 李重俊; died 7 August 707), posthumous name Crown Prince Jiemin (節愍太子), was a crown prince of the Chinese Tang dynasty, during the second reign of his father Emperor Zhongzong. He was made crown prince because the only son of his father's wife Empress Wei, Li Chongrun, had been killed before his father's return to the throne, but on account of his mother's low birth, he was often humiliated by Empress Wei's daughter Li Guo'er the Princess Anle and her husband Wu Chongxun (武崇訓). In 707, in anger, he started a coup and killed Wu Chongxun and his father Wu Sansi the Prince of Dejing, but his subsequent attempt to arrest Empress Wei, Li Guo'er, and Consort Shangguan Wan'er was thwarted, and he was killed in flight.

== Background ==
It is not known when Li Chongjun was born, but it was recorded that he was the third son of Emperor Zhongzong (Li Xian), although his younger brother Emperor Shang was born in either 695 or 698, and so he must be born sometime there before. It is not known who his mother was other than that she was not Emperor Zhongzong's wife Empress Wei. It is further unknown whether he was born before or during Emperor Zhongzong's brief first reign in 684, or during his exile from 684 to 698. However, upon the recall of Li Xian, then carrying the title of Prince of Lulin during the reign of Li Chongjun's grandmother Wu Zetian, to the capital Luoyang, Wu Zetian created Li Chongjun the Prince of Yixing.

In February 705, Li Xian was restored to the throne after Wu Zetian was overthrown in a coup. He created Li Chongjun the Prince of Wei and made him the prefect of Luo Prefecture (洛州, i.e., Luoyang). He was also made a general and the commandant at Yang Prefecture (揚州, roughly modern Yangzhou, Jiangsu), although he remained at Luoyang and did not report to Yang Prefecture.

== As crown prince ==
In 706, Li Chongjun was created crown prince. It was said that he was intelligent and decisive, but because he lacked good teachers, he did not act properly. Emperor Zhongzong made his brothers-in-law Yang Shenjiao (楊慎交) the husband of Princess Changning and Wu Chongxun the husband of Li Guo'er the Princess Anle his advisors. It was said that all Yang and Wu did were to play sports with Li Chongjun and were not carrying out actions to educate or protect him. His staff members Yao Ting (姚珽) and Ping Zhenshen (平貞慎) did frequently advise him to act properly, and Li Chongjun treated them with respect, but could not carry out their suggestions.

At that time, Wu Chongxun's father Wu Sansi the Prince of Dejing was a lover of Empress Wei and a trusted advisor to Emperor Zhongzong, and shortly after Li Chongjun was created crown prince, he persuaded Li Chongjun to suggest that five officials who had been instrumental in returning Emperor Zhongzong to the throne but who had subsequently lost out to Wu Sansi in a power struggle -- Jing Hui, Huan Yanfan, Zhang Jianzhi, Yuan Shuji, and Cui Xuanwei—be killed and their clans be slaughtered. Emperor Zhongzong did not accept the suggestion, although subsequently the five were all either killed cruelly or died in exile.

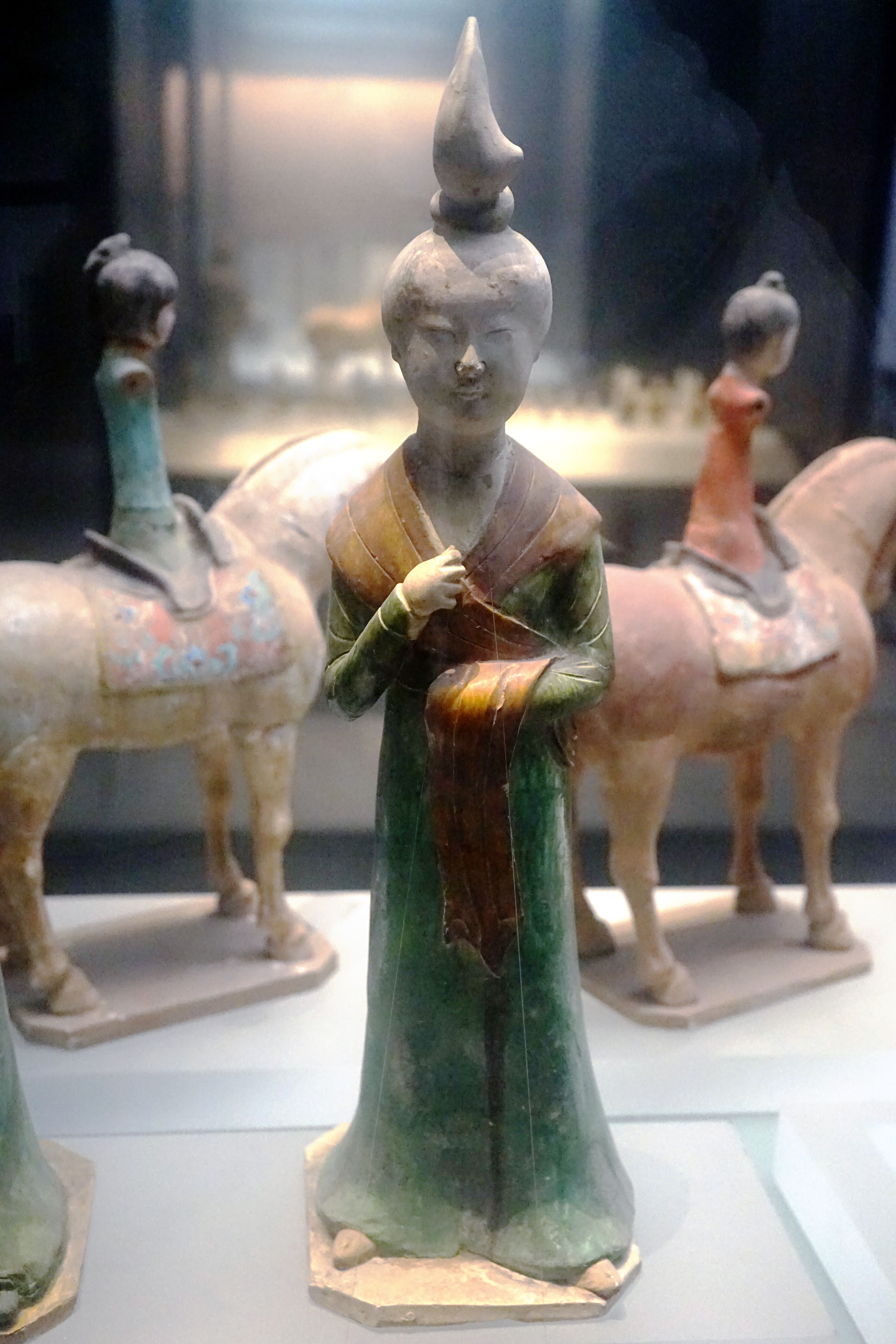
Pottery female attendant unearthed from Li Chongjun's tomb

Meanwhile, because Li Chongjun was not born of Empress Wei, she disliked him. Further, Wu Chongxun and Li Guo'er both often humiliated Li Chongjun, sometimes even calling him "slave" on account of his mother's lower birth. Li Guo'er, Emperor Zhongzong's favorite daughter, also often suggested to Emperor Zhongzong that he depose Li Chongjun and make her crown princess. In fall 707 (by which time the capital had moved back to Chang'an), Li Chongjun's anger erupted, and he, the ethnically Mohe general Li Duozuo, and his father's cousin Li Qianli (李千里) the Prince of Cheng rose in rebellion, along with other generals Li Sichong (李思沖), Li Chengkuang (李承況), Dugu Yizhi (獨孤褘之), and Shazha Zhongyi (沙吒忠義). They took a group of imperial guards and attacked Wu Sansi's mansion, killing him and Wu Chongxun. They then attacked the palace, seeking to arrest Empress Wei, Li Guo'er, and Emperor Zhongzong's concubine Consort Shangguan Wan'er (who also had an affair with Wu Sansi). The imperial guards at the palace defended against the attack, and Li Chongjun hesitated—hoping to be able to converse with Emperor Zhongzong himself to plead his case. The eunuch Yang Sixu (楊思勗) took the opportunity to counterattack and kill Li Chongjun's forward commander, Li Duozuo's son-in-law Ye Huli (野呼利). Emperor Zhongzong then spoke to Li Chongjun's soldiers, urging them to desert. The soldiers thereafter turned against Li Chongjun and killed Li Duozuo, Li Chengkuang, Dugu, and Shazha; in a separate attack, Li Qianli and his son Li Xi (李禧) the Prince of Tianshui were killed in battle. Li Chongjun fled with some 100 soldiers toward the Qinling Mountains, but soldiers deserted on the way, and by the time he reached Hu (戶縣, near Chang'an), he only had several soldiers with him. As they were resting under a tree, the soldiers killed him and surrendered.

Emperor Zhongzong presented Li Chongjun's head to the imperial ancestral temple (in other words, treating him as having committed treason), and then also presented it to the caskets of Wu Sansi and Wu Chongxun. He then hung Li Chongjun's head on the government wall. None of Li Chongjun's staff members, fearful that they would be accused of treason themselves, dared to approach Li Chongjun's body, but the secretary general of Yonghe County (永和, in modern Linfen, Shanxi), Ning Jiaxu (甯嘉勗), took off his own shirt, wrapped Li Chongjun's head in it, and wept bitterly—and as a result was demoted to be the secretary general of the distant Xingping County (興平, in modern Foshan, Guangdong). After Emperor Zhongzong's death in 710, Empress Wei was overthrown in a coup led by Li Chongjun's cousin Li Longji the Prince of Linzi and their aunt Princess Taiping, and Li Longji's father and Li Chongjun's uncle Li Dan the Prince of Xiang became emperor (as Emperor Ruizong). Emperor Ruizong restored Li Chongjun's title as crown prince, reburied him with honors due a crown prince and gave him the posthumous name of Jiemin (meaning "self-controlled and suffering").

== Personal Information ==
Li Chongjun's consort was Lady Yang; her younger sister Empress Yuanxian was mother of the future Emperor Suzong of Tang.

Chongjun had a son named Li Zonghui (李宗晖) born by Lady Yang. Zonghui would be created Prince of Huyang during the reign of his grand-uncle Emperor Ruizong of Tang and serve as Taichangyuanwaiqing (太常员外卿) in the Tianbao era of Emperor Xuanzong of Tang.

== Notes and references ==
- Old Book of Tang, vol.86.
- New Book of Tang, vol.81.
- Zizhi Tongjian, vols. 208, 209.
