= Li Tan =

- Prince of Jianning 建寧王
- Died: c.February 757 A.D.
- Spouse: Lady Zhang (marriage after his death), posthumously honored Empress Gongshun 恭順皇后
Posthumous name
- Prince of Qi 齊王 (honored in 768); Emperor Chengtian 承天皇帝
- Father: Emperor Suzong of Tang
- Mother: Consort Zheng

Li Tan (李倓) (died c.February 757), known by his princely title of Prince of Jianning (建寧王), posthumously honored as the Prince of Qi (齊王) and then Emperor Chengtian (承天皇帝, literally "the emperor who bore the heaven"), was an imperial prince of the Chinese Tang dynasty. He was a son of Emperor Suzong who was credited with suggesting to his father the idea of fleeing to Lingwu during the Anshi Rebellion, allowing Emperor Suzong to eventually reestablish a power base and defeat the rebellion. He was also credited with protecting his father on the way to Lingwu. However, he offended Emperor Suzong's favorite concubine Consort Zhang and the powerful eunuch Li Fuguo by accusing them of crimes; in turn, they accused him of having designs on the life of his older brother Li Chu the Prince of Guangping, causing Emperor Suzong to order him to commit suicide. After Li Chu became emperor in 762 (as Emperor Daizong), he posthumously honored Li Tan, first as the Prince of Qi, and then as Emperor Chengtian, to recognize him for his contributions.

== Background ==
It is not known when Li Tan was born. He was the third son of Li Heng, then the Crown Prince under Li Tan's grandfather Emperor Xuanzong. His mother was a Consort Zhang, of whom nothing else was recorded in history, and who was not the same Consort Zhang who Li Tan later offended. During Emperor Xuanzong's Tianbao era (742-756), Li Tan was created the Prince of Jianning, and was known for his decisiveness and abilities. He was also known for archery.

== During Anshi Rebellion ==
In 755, the general An Lushan rebelled against Emperor Xuanzong's rule, and by 756 was approaching the Tang capital Chang'an, forcing Emperor Xuanzong to flee with his family and close associates. Emperor Xuanzong intended to flee to Jiannan Circuit (劍南, roughly modern Sichuan and Chongqing), but as he reached Mawei (馬嵬, in modern Xianyang, Shaanxi), the imperial guards escorting him, blaming An's rebellion on Emperor Xuanzong's favorite concubine Consort Yang Yuhuan and her cousin, the chancellor, Yang Guozhong, slaughtered the Yang household and forced Emperor Xuanzong to execute Consort Yang. After the incident, Emperor Xuanzong was intent on continuing to Chengdu (the capital of Jiannan Circuit). Li Heng did not follow Emperor Xuanzong, and initially remained at Mawei in response to the people of the region's request that he remain to fight against An. Li Heng initially stated that he wished to follow Emperor Xuanzong to Chengdu, but Li Tan convinced him to stay, saying:

The rebellious Hu [(i.e., An)] has revolted, and the realm is breaking into pieces. If you do not follow the wishes of the people, how can the dynasty recover? For those responsible for the state, the greatest filial piety would be to preserve the state. Now, if you follow the Supreme One [(i.e., Emperor Xuanzong)] into the Shu region [(i.e., Jiannan)], then the region east of the San Pass [(散關, in modern Baoji, Shaanxi)] will no longer be possessed by the imperial house, and how can you then maintain the support of the people? Your Royal Highness should gather brave men and temporarily go to Hexi [(河西, i.e., modern central and western Gansu)] to gather the troops and examine the border armies. There will be at least 100,000 men, and then summon Li Guangbi and Guo Ziyi to join forces with you. This is the best way to let the empire recover.

Li Tan's proposal was supported by his older brother Li Chu the Prince of Guangping, and Li Heng finally agreed and sent messengers to report this to Emperor Xuanzong, who agreed and gave Li Heng part of the imperial guard troops before heading further toward Chengdu. Li Tan then suggested that they head to the important border outpost Lingwu and gather troops there, and Li Heng agreed. On the way to Lingwu, Li Heng's small group of guards had to repeatedly battle bandits and deserting soldiers, and Li Tan repeatedly had to personally lead troops to protect his father. Whenever Li Heng had nothing to eat, Li Tan would weep. His acts of bravery and filial piety impressed the soldiers.

Once Li Heng reached Lingwu and gathered the troops there, at the urging of the generals, he took imperial title (as Emperor Suzong). He considered making Li Tan the supreme commander of the armed forces, but at the urging of his officials, who pointed out that this would create an ambiguity as to whether Li Chu, who was his oldest son, or Li Tan, would be his heir, Emperor Xuanzong made Li Chu the supreme commander. (According to the Zizhi Tongjian, it was Emperor Suzong's close advisor Li Mi who suggested this, and Li Tan, who was faithful to his brother, thanked Li Mi for proposing this to reduce the ambiguity.) Li Tan was instead given the command of the imperial guards.

Li Tan soon ran into conflict with Consort Zhang and the powerful eunuch Li Fuguo, who were allies, and he often accused Consort Zhang and Li Fuguo of improprieties. On one occasion, when he praised Emperor Suzong for following Li Mi's recommendation to strip a jewel-studded saddle that Emperor Xuanzong gave to Consort Zhang as a gift of its jewels and give the jewels to the soldiers as rewards, Consort Zhang became angry and bore grudges against both him and Li Mi. Further, Li Tan plotted to kill Consort Zhang and Li Fuguo. Consort Zhang and Li Fuguo instead acted first, falsely accusing Li Tan of planning to kill Li Chu to that he could become Emperor Suzong's heir. Emperor Suzong, believing in Consort Zhang's and Li Fuguo's accusations, ordered Li Tan to commit suicide in early 757.

== Posthumous recognition ==
In 762, Li Chu (whose name had been changed to Li Yu by that point) succeeded Emperor Suzong as emperor (as Emperor Daizong). He posthumously honored Li Tan as the Prince of Qi. In 768, Emperor Daizong and Li Mi discussed further posthumously honoring Li Tan, and Li Mi initially suggested posthumously honoring Li Tan as a crown prince, citing the example of Emperor Xuanzong honoring his younger brothers in that manner. Emperor Daizong, believing that Li Tan's contributions far exceeded those princes, decided instead to posthumously honor Li Tan as emperor and rebury him with ceremony due an emperor. He also posthumously married Lady Zhang, the daughter of his aunt Princess Xinxing, to Li Tan, honoring her as Empress Gongshun (恭順皇后). He had Li Tan worshiped at the same temple that Emperor Suzong had dedicated to his older brother Li Cong, whom Emperor Suzong posthumously honored as an emperor as well.

== In popular culture ==
- Portrayed by Qin Junjie in The Glory of Tang Dynasty. (2017)

== Notes and references ==
- Old Book of Tang, vol. 116.
- New Book of Tang, vol. 82.
- Zizhi Tongjian, vols. 218, 219, 224.
