= Empress Yuanxian =

- Lady Yang
- Born: 699; Huayin, Shaanxi, China
- Died: 729
- Spouse: Emperor Xuanzong
- Issue: Emperor Suzong; Princess Ningqing
Names
- Family name: Yang
Regnal name
- Yang Guipin
Posthumous name
- Empress Yuanxian
- Father: Yang Zhiqing

Empress Yuanxian (元獻皇后; 699 — 729) also known as Yang Guipin was a Chinese imperial consort of Emperor Xuanzong and the mother of Emperor Suzong of Tang.

== Background ==
Lady Yang was from the Yang family of Hongnong, an imperial clan of the Sui dynasty. Her great-grandfather Yang Shida (楊士達) was a high -level official during Sui and had been given the title Prince of Zheng (鄭王). He was also the brother of Lady Yang, the mother of Wu Zetian.

Her father Yang Zhiqing (楊知慶) was a general of the imperial guards during the Tang dynasty. Her sister was the wife of former Crown Prince Li Chongjun who was beheaded in a power struggle with Empress Wei, Princess Anle, and imperial consort Shangguan Wan'er. Her sister was honored as Crown Princess Jiemin.

== Imperial Consort ==
Lady Yang became a concubine of Li Longji, the son of Emperor Ruizong with the title of liangyuan (良媛). She became pregnant when Li Longji was locked in a power struggle with his aunt, Emperor Ruizong's sister Princess Taiping. Princess Taiping had placed many associates in the crown prince's palace to spy on Li Longji and that she did not want him to have many sons. She gave birth to a son named Li Sisheng.

After Li Longji defeated his political rivals, he ascended to the throne as Emperor Xuanzong. He honored Lady Yang with the honorable title of Guipin. Her son was raised by Li Longji's official wife, Empress Wang, or her own elder sister Crown Princess Yang widow of Li Chongjun. She gave birth to a daughter, Princess Ningqing, who later married Zhang Ji (張垍), the second son of Zhang Yue, a prominent government official.

Yang Guipin was expelled by Li Longji and died in 729 at the age of 30. Her relatives, Consort Wu and Yang Guifei were the favorites of Emperor Xuanzong. Yang Guifei's cousin Yang Guozhong later sparked the An Lushan rebellion. Li Sisheng, now Li Heng, was supported as the next emperor after defeating the rebels. Emperor Xuanzong became a Taishang Huang, or retired emperor. He posthumously honored Yang Guipin as Empress Yuanxian.

== In popular culture ==
- Portrayed by Liu Tingyu in the 2003 Chinese television series Women of the Tang Dynasty
