= Zhang Gao =

Zhang Gao (張鎬) (died 764), courtesy name Congzhou (從周), formally the Duke of Pingyuan (平原公), was a Chinese musician and politician who lived during the Tang dynasty. He served as a chancellor during the reign of Emperor Suzong. He was known for his blunt suggestions, which eventually led to his removal as chancellor.

== Background ==
It is not known when Zhang Gao was born, but it is known that his family was from Bo Prefecture (博州, roughly modern Liaocheng, Shandong). His great-grandfather Zhang Shanjian (張善見), grandfather Zhang Wuding (張武定), and father Zhang Zhigu (張知古) all served as prefectural-level officials. Zhang Gao himself was said to be handsome and ambitious, and he often conversed about the affairs of the military and statecraft. He was also said to have studied the Confucian classics but was also devoted to fishing and hunting. In his youth, he studied under the Tang dynasty scholar and official Wu Jing (吳兢), and Wu respected him. Later, when Zhang Gao travelled to the Tang capital Chang'an, he lived in a solitary room and did not associate much with others. However, he liked to drink and played the Guqin. If honored men at court invited him to feast, he would go for the sole purpose of getting drunk.

Toward the end of Tianbao era (742-756) of Emperor Xuanzong, the chancellor Yang Guozhong wanted to retain talented men on his staff. He summoned Zhang and, after meeting him, recommended Zhang to be Zuo Shiyi (左拾遺), a low-level official at the examination bureau of government (門下省, Menxia Sheng). After the general An Lushan rebelled in 755 and established his own state of Yan, Yang often consulted Zhang on military matters, and it was at the recommendation of Zhang and another consultant, Xiao Xin (蕭昕), that Yang made another official, Lai Tian (來瑱), a general, and Lai enjoyed some successes against Yan forces. In summer 756, Yan forces approached Chang'an, forcing Emperor Xuanzong to flee toward Chengdu. Zhang followed Emperor Xuanzong on foot to Chengdu.

== During Emperor Suzong's reign ==
Emperor Xuanzong's son and crown prince Li Heng, however, did not follow him to Chengdu but fled to Lingwu instead, where he was declared emperor (as Emperor Suzong of Tang). When the news reached Emperor Xuanzong, he recognized Emperor Suzong as emperor and took the title of Taishang Huang (retired emperor). He sent a number of officials, including Zhang Gao, to attend to Emperor Suzong, and in 757, Zhang reached Emperor Suzong's makeshift court at Fengxiang (鳳翔, in modern Baoji, Shaanxi). As Emperor Suzong was impressed by Zhang's suggestions, he made Zhang Jianyi Daifu (諫議大夫), a consultant at the examination bureau. He soon further promoted Zhang to be Zhongshu Shilang (中書侍郎), the deputy head of the legislative bureau (中書省, Zhongshu Sheng) and gave him the designation Tong Zhongshu Menxia Pingzhangshi (同中書門下平章事), making him a chancellor de facto. At that time, Emperor Suzong retained several hundred Buddhist monks to recite sutras day and night, hoping to draw divine favor, and their voices carried within and without the makeshift palace. Zhang, wanting to end the practice, spoke to Emperor Suzong:

An emperor can put down a rebellion and calm his people only by improving his virtues. One cannot make the realm peaceful by simply giving food to monks.

Emperor Suzong was said to agree with his words, but historical accounts did not indicate whether the practice stopped. Meanwhile, as Emperor Suzong believed Zhang to be capable in both civilian and military matters, he soon made Zhang the military governor (jiedushi) of Henan Circuit (河南, roughly modern Henan and Shandong) and commander of the forces in the region, replacing Helan Jinming (賀蘭進明). Zhang knew that, at that time, the general Zhang Xun and the city that he was defending, Suiyang, were under heavy siege, and he therefore tried to march his troops at twice the speed to try to save Suiyang. He also ordered the generals in the region to report to Suiyang to try to save it, but by the time that he arrived in the locale, Suiyang had already fallen, and Zhang Xun was killed by the Yan general Yin Ziqi (尹子奇). In anger, Zhang Gao summoned one of the generals who had disobeyed his order and who had refused to try to save Suiyang, Luqiu Xiao (閭丘曉) and executed Luqiu by caning. Subsequently, after a joint Tang and Huige force recaptured the Tang eastern capital Luoyang (the force had recaptured Chang'an earlier), Zhang and five military governors under his command, Lu Jiong (魯炅), Lai Tian, Li Zhi (李祇) the Prince of Wu, Li Siye, and Li Huan (李奐), recaptured the commanderies throughout the Henan and Hedong (河東, i.e., modern Shanxi) region, except for two commanderies where the Yan generals Neng Yuanhao (能元皓) and Gao Xiuyan (高秀巖) held out. He was created the Duke of Nanyang.

Meanwhile, Tang forces were putting An Lushan's son and successor An Qingxu under siege at Yecheng, and with the siege proceeding and the last major remaining Yan general, Shi Siming, submitting his post of Fanyang (范陽, in modern Beijing) to Tang, it appeared that the realm would be soon peaceful. However, Zhang distrusted Shi, believing that Shi was merely buying time and would soon rebel himself; he thus advised Emperor Suzong to use extreme caution with regard to Shi. He also distrusted another Tang general, Xu Shuji (許叔冀) and suggested that Emperor Suzong recall Xu to the capital. However, Emperor Suzong trusted the reports of eunuchs he sent to meet with Shi and Xu, which stated that both Shi and Xu were trustworthy. In spring 758, Emperor Suzong thus removed Zhang from his posts as chancellor and military governor, instead sending him to Jing Prefecture (荊州, roughly modern Jingzhou, Hubei) to serve as its defender. (Zhang's warnings proved to be prescient, however, as Shi soon rebelled, and after Shi's forces had some preliminary victories over Xu, Xu surrendered to him.) Zhang was soon recalled serving on the staff of Emperor Suzong's crown prince Li Yu and Zuo Sanqi Changshi (左散騎常侍), a high-level advisor at the examination bureau. In 761, however, after a plot to make Emperor Suzong's cousin Li Zhen (李珍) the Prince of Qi emperor was discovered, as Zhang had previously purchased a mansion from Li Zhen, he was considered Li Zhen's associate. Emperor Suzong thus exiled him to Chen Prefecture (辰州, roughly modern Huaihua, Hunan) to serve as the census officer.

== During Emperor Daizong's reign ==
Emperor Suzong died in 762, and Li Yu succeeded him (as Emperor Daizong). Emperor Daizong pardoned many officials who had been punished during Emperor Suzong's reign, and he made Zhang Gao the prefect of Fu Prefecture (撫州, roughly modern Fuzhou, Jiangxi). He soon made Zhang the prefect of Hong Prefecture (洪州, roughly modern Nanchang, Jiangxi) as well as the commander of the forces in the seven prefectures around Hong Prefecture. He also created Zhang the Duke of Pingyuan. Subsequently, when forces under the agrarian rebel Yuan Chao (袁晁) were disturbing the region, Zhang led his own forces at Shangrao (上饒, in modern Shangrao, Jiangxi) and defeated Yuan's forces, killing several thousand. He also killed two other significant agrarian rebels, Yang Zhao (楊昭) and Shen Qianzai (沈千載). Zhang was thereafter made the governor (觀察使, Guanchashi) of Jiangnan West Circuit (江南西道, roughly modern Jiangxi). He died in 764.

It was said that, despite Zhang's meteoric rise—becoming chancellor within three years of being a civilian—he was respected for his honesty and humility, as well as his willingness to open himself to his subordinates and good insight. Therefore, despite his lack of seniority, he was respected as any other senior official.

== Notes and references ==
- Old Book of Tang, vol. 111.
- New Book of Tang, vol. 139.
- Zizhi Tongjian, vols. 217, 219, 220, 222.
