= Cui Huan =

Chinese politician

Cui Huan (崔渙) (died January 14, 769) was a Chinese politician during the Tang dynasty, serving as a chancellor briefly during the reign of Emperor Suzong—although he was commissioned by Emperor Suzong's father Emperor Xuanzong, not Emperor Suzong.

== Background ==
It is not known when Cui Huan was born. His grandfather Cui Xuanwei was a chancellor during the reigns of Wu Zetian and her son Emperor Zhongzong of Tang and was a key figure in Emperor Zhongzong's restoration. Cui Huan's father Cui Qu (崔璩) served as a deputy minister during the reign of Emperor Zhongzong's nephew Emperor Xuanzong and was said to be a capable writer. Cui Huan had at least two brothers—an older brother named Cui Zhen (崔震) and a younger brother named Cui Bi (崔賁).

Cui Huan himself was said to be well-learned in the Confucian classics and rhetoric. He started his official service career as the civil service officer (司功參軍, Sigong Canjun) at Bo Prefecture (亳州, roughly modern Bozhou, Anhui), and later served as Simen Yuanwailang (司門員外郎), a junior official at the ministry of justice. It was said that he did not flatter the chancellor Yang Guozhong and therefore was disliked by Yang. Yang thus had him sent out of the capital Chang'an to serve as the governor of Baxi Commandery (巴西, roughly modern Mianyang, Sichuan).

== As chancellor ==
In 755, the general An Lushan rose against Emperor Xuanzong's rule, and by summer 756, Emperor Xuanzong was forced to flee Chang'an, toward Chengdu. Emperor Xuanzong's son and crown prince Li Heng fled to Lingwu instead and was proclaimed emperor there (as Emperor Suzong), and he honored Emperor Xuanzong as Taishang Huang (retired emperor). Meanwhile, though, Emperor Xuanzong, unaware of this, was still exercising imperial authority, and on his way to Chengdu made Fang Guan a chancellor. As he went through Baxi Commandery, Cui Huan welcomed him. When Emperor Xuanzong conversed with Cui, he was impressed by Cui's talent and regretted not promoting him earlier. Fang also recommended Cui. Emperor Xuanzong thus made Cui Menxia Shilang (門下侍郎), the deputy head of the examination bureau of government (門下省, Menxia Sheng), and chancellor de facto with the title Tong Zhongshu Menxia Pingzhangshi (同中書門下平章事). He had Cui accompany him to Chengdu.

Emperor Xuanzong soon heard that Emperor Suzong had taken the throne, and he recognized Emperor Suzong as the new emperor. He sent Cui and fellow chancellors Wei Jiansu and Fang to Lingwu to officially invest Emperor Suzong as emperor and gave them the imperial seal and the edict officially passing the throne. They encountered Emperor Suzong, who was then launching a counterattack, at Shunhua (順化, in modern Qingyang, Gansu), and they offered the seal and the edict to Emperor Suzong. Emperor Suzong declined, stating that with empire still in turmoil, it was not an appropriate time for him to officially take the throne, instead putting the seal and the edict aside and paying them daily respects, as they represented Emperor Xuanzong.

Meanwhile, because the empire was then in turmoil due to An Lushan's rebellion, the regular civil service process was not being carried out. Emperor Suzong sent Cui to the Yangtze River-Huai River region to select candidates for civil service, but Cui was not considered competent at this task. (Cui's biography in the Old Book of Tang claimed that Cui overly listened to his subordinates, who accepted bribes to recommend people, while his biography in the New Book of Tang, which was less critical of him, claimed that he was willing to select people that he knew without fear that he would be accused of nepotism, but was nevertheless not very good at selecting candidates.) In fall 757, Emperor Suzong removed him from his chancellor position and made him the governor of Yuhang Commandery (餘杭, roughly modern Hangzhou, Zhejiang), as well as the examiner and commander of the region east of the Yangtze.

== After serving as chancellor ==
At a later point, after Tang forces had recaptured Chang'an, Cui Huan was recalled to the capital to serve as deputy minister of civil service affairs (吏部侍郎, Libu Shilang). It was said that his life was simple and unambitious, and he was respected by others for this. He later served as chief imperial censor (御史大夫, Yushi Daifu).

During the reign of Emperor Suzong's son Emperor Daizong, the chancellor Yuan Zai dominated the imperial government, in association with the eunuch Dong Xiu (董秀). Cui despised Yuan, and on an occasion, when he met with Emperor Daizong, he accused Yuan of being treacherous. Emperor Daizong, defending Yuan, stated:

While Yuan Zai is careless, he made peace among the internal [(i.e., eunuchs)] and external officials, and I think he is a good subject.

Cui responded:

Peace is only important in association with respect. If one has no respect, what good is peace? The wars have just ended, and it is important for officials to have integrity. Yuan Zai is the chancellor, and he should carry out reforms to send a message throughout the realm. Instead, he uses his power to foster factionalism, destroys the law in the name of flexibility, personally deals out favors in the name of grace, and permits his subordinates to carry out illegal deeds. This is a way to harm the empire and to shame his lord. This is no way to rule.

Emperor Daizong became silent and did not respond.

Meanwhile, Cui also served as special emissary for the collection of Qingmiao taxes (青苗, i.e., taxes imposed on newly grown crops), which were used for paying official salaries. It was said that because of requests from the lower officials, he used these taxes not only to pay the higher officials, but also the lower ones. Yuan's associate Zhang Qing (張青) argued that this was inappropriate, and Emperor Daizong had Cui investigated and interrogated. Cui had no response to the accusations and was demoted to be the prefect of Dao Prefecture (道州, in modern Yongzhou, Hunan). He died in 769 and was posthumously honored and given the posthumous name of Yuan (元, meaning "discerning").

== Notes and references ==
- Old Book of Tang, vol. 108.
- New Book of Tang, vol. 120.
- Zizhi Tongjian, vols. 218, 219.
