= Wei Jiansu =

Wei Jiansu (韋見素) (687 – 25 December 762), courtesy name Huiwei (會微), formally Duke Zhongzhen of Bin (豳忠貞公), was a Chinese politician who served as a chancellor during the reigns of Emperor Xuanzong of Tang and his son Emperor Suzong. As a young man, Wei served as a military aide to Emperor Xuanzong's father, the future Emperor Ruizong, then the Prince of Dan. He later served in various regional postings and senior offices at the Tang court in Chang'an, and though his conduct met with approbation, in the later stages of his career he was considered controllable. This, as well as his early connection to Emperor Ruizong, allowed the leading chancellor Yang Guozhong to install Wei as chancellor and director of the examination bureau late in Emperor Xuanzong's reign. During the chaos of the An Lushan Rebellion, Wei accompanied Emperor Xuanzong and Yang in their flight from Chang'an and was severely injured when the imperial guard massacred Yang and his family. Subsequently, after Emperor Suzong claimed imperial title and Emperor Xuanzong abdicated, Wei initially retained his chancellorship but was subsequently shifted to positions of less responsibility. He eventually left office altogether and died in retirement in December 762.

== Background ==
Wei Jiansu was born in 687, during the first reign of Emperor Ruizong. His family was from the Tang dynasty capital Chang'an, and traced its ancestry to a line of officials of the Han dynasty, Cao Wei, Northern Zhou, Sui dynasty, and Tang. Wei JIansu's grandfather Wei Fu (韋福) served as a prefectural prefect, and his father Wei Cou (韋湊) served as an official during the reigns of Emperor Ruizong's father Emperor Gaozong, mother Wu Zetian, brother Emperor Zhongzong, Emperor Ruizong himself, and Emperor Ruizong's son Emperor Xuanzong, being known for his honesty and bluntness.

Wei Jiansu himself passed the imperial examinations, and during the Jinglong era (707-710) of Emperor Zhongzong's reign, he served as a military officer at the mansion of Emperor Ruizong, who was then the Prince of Dan. He later served as a guard commander, and then the officer in charge of storage at Henan Municipality (河南府, encompassing the eastern capital Luoyang).

== During Emperor Xuanzong's reign ==
Wei Cou died during Emperor Xuanzong's Kaiyuan era (713–741), and Wei Jiansu left public service to observe a mourning period. Once the mourning period was over, he became the secretary general of the supreme court (大理寺丞, Dali Sicheng), and inherited his father's title of Duke of Pengcheng. At one point, he was accused of an offense lost in history and was demoted to be the military advisor to the prefect of Fang Prefecture (坊州, in modern Yan'an, Shaanxi). He was subsequently recalled to be a low level official at the ministry of treasury and given the honorific title Chaosan Daifu (朝散大夫). He then served at the ministry of defense, before he became Jianyi Daifu (諫議大夫), a consultant at either the legislative bureau (中書省, Zhongshu Sheng) or the examination bureau (門下省, Menxia Sheng).

In 746, Wei was made the examiner of the Jiangxi, Shannan (山南, i.e., modern northern Hubei), Qianzhong (黔中, i.e., modern Guizhou and western Hunan), and Lingnan regions, to tour the regions to examine the customs of the regions and find officials to promote or demote. It was said that wherever he went, he was stern, and the officials were also led into being stern. Upon his return to Chang'an, he was made Jishizhong (給事中), an imperial attendant. He subsequently served as acting deputy minister of public works (工部侍郎, Gongbu Shilang), and then Shangshu You Cheng (尚書右丞), one of the secretaries general at the executive bureau (尚書省, Shangshu Sheng). In 750, he was made the deputy minister of civil service affairs (吏部侍郎, Libu Shilang) and given the honorific title Yinqing Guanglu Daifu (銀青光祿大夫). It was said that Wei was kind and forgiving, and that he was fair in selecting officials while serving as the deputy minister of civil service affairs.

Meanwhile, at this time, the chancellors Yang Guozhong and Chen Xilie were not on good relations, and Emperor Xuanzong did not find Chen to be an appropriate chancellor. In 754, Chen thus resigned, and initially, Emperor Xuanzong wanted to replace him with Ji Wen (吉溫). Yang opposed, because Ji was then aligned with An Lushan, with whom Yang also had a rivalry. Yang consulted the officials Bao Hua (寶華) and Song Yu (宋昱), both of whom told Yang that Wei was elegant but easy to control. Yang thus recommended Wei, and Emperor Xuanzong, remembering Wei's service to Emperor Ruizong while Emperor Ruizong was the Prince of Dan, agreed. In fall 754, Emperor Xuanzong thus made Wei the minister of defense (武部尚書, Wubu Shangshu) with the designation Tong Zhongshu Menxia Pingzhangshi (同中書門下平章事), making him a chancellor de facto. He also made Wei an imperial scholar at Jixian Institute (集賢院) and put him in charge of the examination bureau. It was said that because Yang recommended Wei, Wei followed his directions, and that he did nothing to moderate the growing conflict between Yang and An, eventually leading to An's rebellion in 755.

In 756, after An's forward forces defeated and captured the Tang general Geshu Han at Tong Pass, Emperor Xuanzong, under Yang's advice, decided to abandon Chang'an and flee to Jiannan Circuit (劍南, headquartered in modern Chengdu, Sichuan). On July 13, the imperial train, without announcing to the people of Chang'an, left Chang'an, with Emperor Xuanzong attended to by the imperial clan members, Yang, Wei Jiansu, the official Wei Fangjin (魏方進), the general Chen Xuanli (陳玄禮), and eunuchs and ladies in waiting close to the emperor.

On July 15, Emperor Xuanzong's train reached Mawei Station (馬嵬驛, in modern Xianyang, Shaanxi). The imperial guards were not fed and were angry at Yang Guozhong. Chen also believed that Yang Guozhong provoked this disaster and planned to carry him—and reported his plans to Li Heng through Li Heng's eunuch Li Fuguo, but Li Heng was hesitated and gave no approval. Meanwhile, though, Tufan emissaries, who followed Emperor Xuanzong south, were meeting with Yang Guozhong and complaining that they were also not fed. The imperial guard soldiers took this opportunity to proclaim that Yang Guozhong was planning treason along with the Tufan emissaries, and they killed him, along with his son Yang Xuan (楊暄), the Ladies of Han and Qin, and Wei Fangjin. Wei Jiansu was also nearly killed, but was spared at the last moment with severe injuries. The soldiers then surrounded Emperor Xuanzong's pavilion, and refused to scatter even after Emperor Xuanzong came out to comfort them and order them to scatter. Chen publicly urged him to put Emperor Xuanzong's favorite concubine and Yang Guozhong's cousin Consort Yang Yuhuan to death—which Emperor Xuanzong initially declined. After Wei Jiansu's son Wei E (韋諤) and Gao Lishi spoke further, Emperor Xuanzong finally resolved to do so. He therefore had Gao take Consort Yang to a Buddhist shrine and strangle her there. Emperor Xuanzong had Li Mao (李瑁) the Prince of Shou visit Wei Jiansu and give him medication.

After the Yangs' death, Wei Jiansu was the only remaining high-level official in the imperial train, and the remaining generals had differences in opinion about what to do next—with many not wanting to proceed further to Jiannan because Yang was the military governor (jiedushi) of Jiannan, and therefore they saw Jiannan as a potential trap. There were therefore various suggestions: to flee to Hexi (河西, headquartered in modern Wuwei, Gansu) and Longyou (隴右, headquartered in modern Haidong Prefecture, Qinghai) Circuits; to flee to Lingwu; to flee to Taiyuan; and to return to Chang'an. Emperor Xuanzong was intent on still going to Jiannan, but did not dare to offend the soldiers. At Wei E's suggestion, he proceeded to Fufeng (扶風, in modern Baoji, Shaanxi), leaving Li Heng the Crown Prince behind as rear guard—but Li Heng was subsequently detained by the soldiers, who believed that a counterattack should be launched, and eventually departed from Emperor Xuanzong and proceeded to Lingwu.

After Li Heng's departure, Emperor Xuanzong continued his trek south, but the soldiers were unhappy, some going as far as cursing the emperor. Fortuitously, though, a large cache of silk that Shu Commandery (蜀郡, roughly modern Chengdu) arrived. Emperor Xuanzong declared to the soldiers that it was his fault that a rebellion occurred, and that the soldiers should take the silk and then return home and let just the imperial train go to Shu Commandery. The soldiers were touched, and no longer considered rebelling against the emperor. In fall 756, after Emperor Xuanzong reached Baxi Commandery (巴西, roughly modern Mianyang, Sichuan), he made Wei, in addition to being the minister of defense, Zuo Xiang (左相) -- the head of the examination bureau and a post considered one for a chancellor. When they reached Shu Commandery, Emperor Xuanzong further created him the Duke of Bin and gave him the honorific title Jinzi Guanglu Daifu (金紫光祿大夫).

== During Emperor Suzong's reign ==
Meanwhile, Li Heng had declared himself emperor at Lingwu (as Emperor Suzong). When Emperor Suzong's messengers reached Emperor Xuanzong, he gave public approval and took the title of Taishang Huang (retired emperor). He sent Wei Jiansu and other chancellors Fang Guan, and Cui Huan to Lingwu to official invest Emperor Suzong as emperor and gave them the imperial seal and the edict officially passing the throne. They encountered Emperor Suzong, who was then launching a counterattack, at Shunhua (順化, in modern Qingyang, Gansu), and they offered the seal and the edict to Emperor Suzong. Emperor Suzong declined, stating that with empire still in turmoil, it was not an appropriate time for him to officially take the throne, instead putting the seal and the edict aside and paying them daily respects, as they represented Emperor Xuanzong.

Meanwhile, though, Emperor Suzong had been impressed with Fang's reputation and therefore particularly honored Fang, giving him most of the responsibilities. In contrast, Emperor Suzong was displeased with how Wei had followed Yang Guozhong's directions and therefore did not pay him much respect, although he allowed Wei to remain chancellor for some time. In spring 757, Wei was made Zuo Puye (左僕射), one of the heads of the executive bureau, and removed from his chancellor post. He was subsequently made a senior advisor to the crown prince. After Emperor Suzong recaptured Chang'an in fall 757, he sent Wei to Shu to escort Emperor Xuanzong back to Chang'an. After Wei brought Emperor Xuanzong back to Chang'an, he was given the honorific title Kaifu Yitong Sansi (開府儀同三司).

In Emperor Suzong's Shangyuan era (760-761), Wei requested to retire on account of a foot ailment, and Emperor Suzong allowed him to do so. He died in December 762, briefly after Emperor Suzong himself had died and been succeeded by his son Emperor Daizong. Wei was given posthumous honors and given an official burial.

== Notes and references ==
- Old Book of Tang, vol.108.
- New Book of Tang, vol.118.
- Zizhi Tongjian, vols. 216, 217, 218, 219, 220.
