= Fang Guan =

Fang Guan (Chinese: 房琯; pinyin: Fáng Guǎn; Wade–Giles: Fang Kuan; 697 – September 15, 763), courtesy name Cilü (次律), formally the Duke of Qinghe (清河公), was a Chinese politician during the Tang dynasty, serving as a chancellor during the reigns of Emperor Xuanzong and Emperor Suzong.

== Background ==
Fang Guan was born in 697, during the first reign of Emperor Ruizong. His family was from the Tang dynasty eastern capital Luoyang. His father Fang Rong served as a chancellor during the subsequent reign of Emperor Ruizong's mother Wu Zetian, but was exiled and died in exile in 705 when Wu Zetian was overthrown in a coup. Fang Guan himself was said to be studious and collected in his youth, and he was able to be an imperial university student on account of his father's position. However, he favored the life of a hermit, and he and one Lü Xiang (呂向) both became hermits in Mount Luhun (陸渾山, near Luoyang) and studied together, for more than a decade.

== During Emperor Xuanzong's reign ==
In 725, during the reign of Emperor Ruizong's son Emperor Xuanzong, Emperor Xuanzong was set to offer sacrifices to heaven and earth at Mount Tai. Fang Guan drafted a proposed text to accompany his sacrifices, and submitted the text to the chancellor Zhang Shuo. Zhang was impressed and recommended him to be Mishu Lang (秘書郎), a clerk at the Palace Library. He later served as the sheriff of Fengyi County (馮翊, in modern Weinan, Shaanxi). He later left office, but was selected in a subsequent imperial examination seeking to fill county magistrate positions, and was made the magistrate of Lushi County (盧氏, in modern Sanmenxia, Henan). It was said that the people of the county praised his rule. In 734, he was made Jiancha Yushi (監察御史), an imperial censor, but that same year was accused of improper handling of cases and demoted to be the census official at Mu Prefecture (睦州, in modern Hangzhou, Zhejiang). He later successively served as the magistrates of Cixi (慈溪, in modern Ningbo, Zhejiang), Songcheng (宋城, in modern Shangqiu, Henan), and Jiyuan Counties, and was said to rule benevolently and reasonably.

In 742, Fang was made Zhuke Yuanwailang (主客員外郎), a low-level official at the ministry of rites (禮部, Libu), and in 744 was promoted to the higher post of Zhuke Langzhong (主客郎中). In 746, he was made Jishizhong (給事中), an imperial attendant, and was created the Baron of Zhangnan. At that time, Emperor Xuanzong was expanding Huaqing Palace (華清宮), known for its hot springs, and he put Fang in charge of building housing for the officials near Huaqing Palace. However, in 747, he was, on account of his association with disgraced officials Li Shizhi and Wei Jian (韋堅), demoted to be the governor of Yichun Commandery (宜春, roughly modern Yichun, Jiangxi). He later successively served as the governor of Langye (琅邪, roughly modern Linyi, Shandong), Ye, and Fufeng (扶風, roughly modern Baoji, Shaanxi) Commanderies, and was known for benevolent rule. In 755, he was recalled to the capital Chang'an to serve as a staff member of Emperor Xuanzong's crown prince Li Heng, and subsequently made the deputy minister of justice (憲部侍郎, Xianbu Shilang).

Later in 755, the military governor (jiedushi) An Lushan rebelled, and by summer 756, the forces of his newly established state of Yan was approaching Chang'an. Emperor Xuanzong fled toward Shu Commandery (蜀郡, roughly modern Chengdu, Sichuan) in panic, leaving most officials behind. Many officials who felt that Emperor Xuanzong overlooked them for promotions surrendered to An, but Fang, even though he was also largely overlooked, invited Zhang Shuo's sons Zhang Jun (張均) and Zhang Ji (張垍), along with Wei Shu (韋述), to try to catch up with Emperor Xuanzong. Once the journey got under way, though, the Zhangs changed their mind and returned to Chang'an (and eventually submitted to An), while Fang continued. He was able to catch up with Emperor Xuanzong at Pu'an Commandery (普安, roughly modern Guangyuan, Sichuan). Emperor Xuanzong was pleased, and made him the deputy minister of civil service affairs (文部侍郎, Wenbu Shilang) and gave him the designation Tong Zhongshu Menxia Pingzhangshi (同中書門下平章事), making him a chancellor de facto. Subsequently, at Fang's recommendation, Emperor Xuanzong also made Cui Huan a chancellor.

== During Emperor Suzong's reign ==
Meanwhile, Li Heng, who did not follow Emperor Xuanzong, declared himself emperor at Lingwu, and when the news reached Emperor Xuanzong, Emperor Xuanzong recognized Emperor Suzong as emperor and took the title Taishang Huang (retired emperor) himself. He sent Fang and fellow chancellors Wei Jiansu and Cui Huan to Lingwu to official invest Emperor Suzong as emperor and gave them the imperial seal and the edict officially passing the throne. They encountered Emperor Suzong, who was then launching a counterattack, at Shunhua (順化, in modern Qingyang, Gansu), and they offered the seal and the edict to Emperor Suzong. Emperor Suzong declined, stating that with empire still in turmoil, it was not an appropriate time for him to officially take the throne, instead putting the seal and the edict aside and paying them daily respects, as they represented Emperor Xuanzong.

Emperor Suzong was impressed with Fang's fervor for the restoration of Tang authority and gave him the most responsibility, and he followed Fang's recommendations in not executing the generals Wang Sili (王思禮) and Lü Chongbi (呂崇賁), who were part of the Tang army defeated at Tong Pass prior to An Lushan's approach on Chang'an. However, it was said that Fang favored big talkers and injected his own likes and dislikes into personnel decisions. This came to Emperor Suzong's attention when Emperor Suzong had decreed that the official Helan Jinming (賀蘭進明) should be made the governor of Nanhai Commandery (南海, roughly modern Guangzhou, Guangdong) and military governor of Lingnan Circuit (headquartered in Guangzhou), and be given an honorary title as chief imperial censor—but Fang instead announced that Helan would be given the honorary title as acting chief imperial censor. When Helan brought this to Emperor Suzong's attention, and further intimated that a decree that Emperor Xuanzong had issued before he became aware that Emperor Suzong had assumed imperial title—commissioning Emperor Suzong and several brothers of his with military commands independent of each other—was intended to allow any of Emperor Xuanzong's sons to be successful and thank him for the commission. Emperor Suzong thus began to distance himself from Fang. Fang, realizing this, requested that he be commissioned to lead an army to recapture Chang'an, hoping to regain imperial favor by battlefield success. Emperor Suzong agreed and further allowed him to select his own staff members. Fang selected such friends as Wang Sili, Deng Jingshan (鄧景山), Li Ji (李揖), and Liu Zhi to serve on his staff, entrusting the strategies to Li Ji and Liu—despite the fact that neither was learned in military matters, going as far as stating, "Even though the rebels have many strong men, none can rival my Liu Zhi." He divided his army into three groups and approached Chang'an, and once he was engaging Yan forces there, he used an ancient tactic from the Spring and Autumn period—putting cattle-drawn wagons in the center and cavalry and infantry on the side. Yan forces responded by beating its drums, terrorizing the cattle, and then setting fire on the wagons. This caused a general panic in both the cattle and the Tang soldiers, causing more than 40,000 casualties. Fang led a counterattack, which was also defeated. However, at the urging of Emperor Suzong's trusted advisor Li Mi, Fang was not punished.

Despite the defeat, though, Fang was still spending most of his day discussing Buddhist and Taoist philosophies with Liu and Li JI, often claiming illness so that he would not need to deal with the affairs of state. He also favored the musician Dong Tinglan (董庭蘭), and Dong thereafter often took bribes to influence Fang on the bribers' behalf. He also tried to reduce the punishment due to one of his friends, Li Heji (李何忌), for lack of filial piety. Meanwhile, he also disrespected fellow chancellor Cui Yuan, drawing Cui Yuan's resentment as well. When an indictment was filed against Dong, he tried to defend Dong, drawing displeasure from Emperor Suzong, who ordered him out of the palace. He thus returned to his own mansion and did not dare to rule on important matters. In summer 757, Emperor Suzong removed him from his chancellor position and replaced him with Zhang Gao, making Fang an advisor to the crown prince instead.

In winter 757, after Tang forces recaptured Chang'an, he returned to Chang'an with Emperor Suzong, and was given the honorific title Jinzi Guanglu Daifu (金紫光祿大夫) and created the Duke of Qinghe. Meanwhile, with him not having any real authorities, his associates were creating public sentiment that he should be restored to power due to his abilities. Emperor Suzong, displeased, issued a sternly-worded edict rebuking Fang and sending him out of Chang'an to serve as the prefect of Bin Prefecture (邠州, roughly modern Xianyang, Shaanxi). It was said that, at the time, after all of the military action, Bin Prefecture was in a state of confusion and disrepair. Once Fang arrived there, he did what he could to comfort the people, repair the buildings, and put officials in their proper places. In 759, Emperor Suzong issued an edict praising him and recalling him to serve on the staff of the new crown prince Li Yu. In 760, he was made the minister of rites (禮部尚書, Libu Shangshu), but was soon sent out of the capital to serve as the prefect of Jin Prefecture (晉州, in modern Linfen, Shanxi) and then the prefect of Han Prefecture (漢州, in modern Deyang, Sichuan). While he was at Han Prefecture, he paid a large bride price to the official Li Rui (李銳) to get Li Rui to give his nephew Lady Lu to be the wife of Fang's oldest son Fang Cheng (房乘), who was blind in both eyes from birth. This use of bride price drew severe criticism against Fang Guan.

== During Emperor Daizong's reign ==
In 762, Emperor Suzong died, and Li Yu became emperor (as Emperor Daizong). In summer 763, he recalled Fang Guan to serve as the minister of justice (刑部尚書, Xingbu Shangshu). While Fang was on the way back to Chang'an, though, he became ill. He died in fall 763, while still on the way, at Lang Prefecture (閬州, in modern Nanchong, Sichuan). He was given posthumous honors, but historical records did not record a posthumous name.

== Christian identity ==
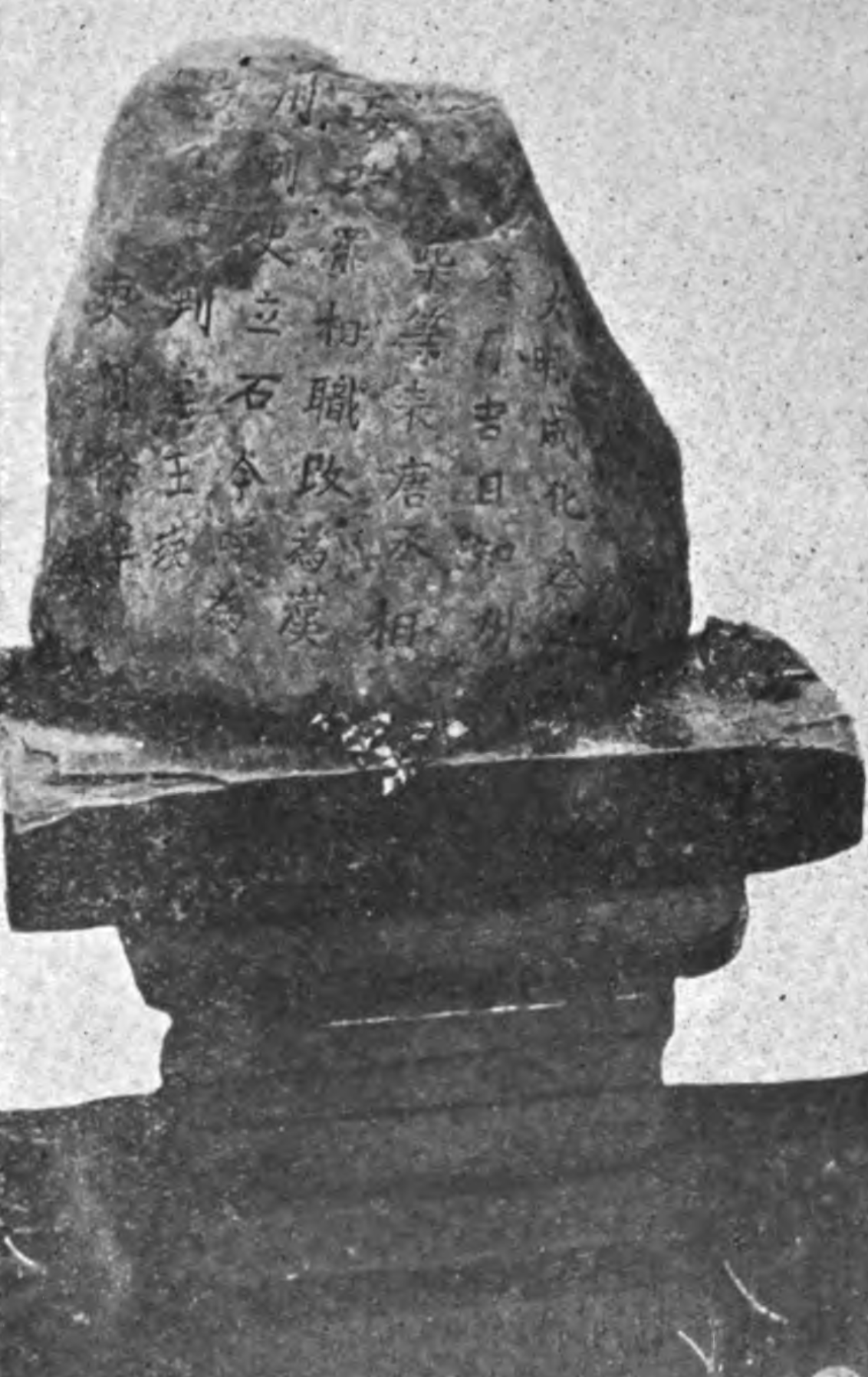
Duke Fang Stone at Guanghan

According to a local tradition in Guanghan (Hanchow, lit. 'Han Prefecture'), Fang Guan was an East Syriac Christian. The tradition says that he worshipped the One God alone. At his daily worship, Fang used to kneel on a stone which later came to be known as the Duke Fang Stone. According to local testimonies, his name was carved on the no-longer-extant Nestorian stele at Wangxiangtai (Wang Hsiang T'ai) Temple. The earlier name for the temple was Jingfu Yuan (Ching Fu Yuan), as in Jingjiao (Ching Chiao, i.e., East Syriac Church in China).

== Notes and references ==
- Old Book of Tang, vol. 111.
- New Book of Tang, vol. 139.
- Zizhi Tongjian, vols. 215, 217, 218, 219, 220.

=== Journal article ===
- Donnithorne, V. H. (1933–1934). "The Golden Age and the Dark Age in Hanchow, Szechwan". Journal of the West China Border Research Society. VI.
