= Empress Zhang (Tang dynasty) =

Empress of China from 758 to 762

Empress Zhang 张皇后
- Empress of the Tang dynasty (758–762)

Empress consort of the Tang dynasty
- Reign: Spring 758 – May 16, 762
- Predecessor: Empress Wang
- Successor: Empress Zhaode
- Born: Unknown; Deng Prefecture (roughly modern Nanyang
- Died: May 16, 762; Chang'an, Tang China
- Spouse: Emperor Suzong of Tang
- Issue: Li Shao, Prince of Xing; Li Tong, Prince of Ding
- Clan: Zhang (张) (by birth); Li (李) (by marriage)
- Father: Zhang Quyì (張去逸)

Empress Zhang (/dʒæŋ/; Chinese: 張皇后, personal name unknown; died May 16, 762) was an empress of the Chinese Tang dynasty. She was the second wife of Emperor Suzong and gained great power during his reign, in alliance with the eunuch Li Fuguo; Their partnership made them virtually untouchable, allowing them to oversee and manipulate all matters in the court while isolating the emperor. But eventually she and Li Fuguo turned against each other late in Emperor Suzong's reign, as the emperor grew gravely ill. Zhang tried to have Li Fuguo put to death, but instead was captured and killed by Li Fuguo.

== Background ==
The future Empress Zhang's family was originally from Deng Prefecture (鄧州, roughly modern Nanyang, Henan). Her grandmother Lady Dou was a younger sister of Consort Dou, a concubine of Emperor Ruizong, whose son Li Longji later became emperor (as Emperor Xuanzong). Consort Dou was put to death by Emperor Ruizong's mother Wu Zetian in 693, while Li Longji was just eight. Lady Dou spent much time raising Li Longji, and later, after Emperor Ruizong returned to the throne in 710, he created Lady Dou the Lady of Deng and honored her greatly. Her sons Zhang Quhuo (張去惑), Zhang Quyí (張去疑), Zhang Qushe (張去奢), Zhang Quyì (張去逸), note different tone than his brother), and Zhang Quying (張去盈) all became key officials, and Zhang Quyì would become the father of the future Empress Zhang.

== As princely consort ==
During Emperor Xuanzong's Tianbao era (742-756), the future Empress Zhang was selected to be a concubine for Emperor Xuanzong's son and crown prince Li Heng, and she carried the title of Liangdi, the highest rank for the Crown Prince's concubines. It was said that after he was forced to divorce his wife Crown Princess Wei in 746, she became his favorite consort. She was said to be intelligent and well-spoken, and she knew how to please him.

In 755, the general An Lushan launched a major rebellion against Emperor Xuanzong's rule, and in 756 was approaching the capital Chang'an, forcing Emperor Xuanzong and Li Heng to flee. On the way to Jiannan Circuit (劍南, roughly modern Sichuan and Chongqing), however, Li Heng left Emperor Xuanzong's train and instead, following the suggestion of his son Li Tan the Prince of Jianning, decided to head for important border military outpost Lingwu to gather troops there to prepare for counterattack. On the way there, he had very few guards, and at night, Consort Zhang would always sleep to the outside of the Crown Prince. When Li Heng told her, "It is not a woman's responsibility to fight the bandits," she responded, "I am afraid that sudden disaster would occur. If it does, I can use my body to shield you, and Your Royal Highness can get away." Once they got to Lingwu, she gave birth to a child, but immediately got up just three days after birth to sew clothes for soldiers. When Li Heng asked her to rest, she responded, "This is no time for me to be idle." He thereafter favored her even more. She would eventually bear two sons for him, Li Shao (李佋) and Li Tong (李侗).

== As imperial consort ==
Soon after Li Heng arrived in Lingwu, the officials and generals there urged him to take the throne, and he did (as Emperor Suzong). He considered creating Consort Zhang empress, but at the advice of his key advisor Li Mi, decided that it was inappropriate to do so before he had a chance to seek the approval of Emperor Xuanzong (whom he honored as Taishang Huang (retired emperor)). Meanwhile, however, around this time Emperor Xuanzong sent her a saddle with seven kinds of jewels studded on it as a gift. Li Mi opined that in the difficult times, it would be inappropriate for her to use such a luxurious item, and therefore suggested instead that the jewels be removed and rewarded to those soldiers with accomplishments. Emperor Suzong agreed—and Li Tan publicly praised the decision, causing Consort Zhang to thereafter bear much resentment toward Li Mi and Li Tan. Meanwhile, she entered into an alliance with Emperor Suzong's trusted eunuch Li Fuguo, and together the two became powerful inside the palace, purportedly carrying out much misdeeds. Li Tan considered trying to kill them, and despite Li Mi's advice to the contrary, Li Tan did not stop his planning. In 757, Consort Zhang and Li Fuguo struck first, accusing Li Tan of plotting to kill his older brother Li Chu the Prince of Guangping, and Emperor Suzong, believing their accusation, forced Li Tan to commit suicide. This caused Li Chu and Li Mi to be fearful of her as well, although at Li Mi's urging, Li Chu did not himself try to kill them. Later that year, after a joint Tang-Huige force recaptured Chang'an under Li Chu's command, she was resentful of Li Chu's accomplishment and therefore spread rumors about Li Chu. Li Mi took this opportunity to resign to become a hermit, but before doing so, urged Emperor Suzong strongly not to listen to false accusations against Li Chu.

In winter 757, after Emperor Suzong returned to Chang'an, he created Consort Zhang the imperial consort rank of Shufei (淑妃), the second highest rank for imperial concubines, but did not immediately create her empress. He also created her sons Li Shao the Prince of Xing and Li Tong the Prince of Ding. Her sisters were created ladies, and her brothers Zhang Qing (張清) and Zhang Qian (張濳) married the Ladies Da'ning and Yanhe, respectively. Emperor Suzong created her empress in spring 758.

== As empress ==
After Empress Zhang was elevated by Emperor Suzong of Tang, she maintained strong imperial favor and gradually expanded her role into state affairs. In close cooperation with the powerful eunuch Li Fuguo, she effectively controlled significant authority within the inner palace (禁中), forming a core power bloc in the court. In her private quarters, many petitioners and visitors—including officials, courtiers, and individuals seeking favors—would approach her directly. Through frequent informal petitions and private channels (私謁), she influenced key decisions such as official appointments and administrative matters, bypassing normal bureaucratic procedures and thereby disrupting the established political order. As her requests became increasingly excessive, Emperor Suzong gradually grew dissatisfied. However, due to the constraints of the inner court power structure and his reliance on these internal forces, he was unable to effectively restrain or remove her influence.

After Empress Zhang became empress, she tried to have her son Li Shao, who was said to be only a few years old, made crown prince. Emperor Suzong, who favored Li Chu as crown prince, could not decide immediately, but after consulting with the official Li Kui, he created Li Chu crown prince later in 758 and changed Li Chu's name to Li Yu. She nevertheless thereafter tried to have Li Yu replaced with Li Shao, but after Li Shao died in 760, because Li Tong was even younger, Li Yu's position was secure.

Throughout the years, Empress Zhang and Li Fuguo's alliance held, and in 760, they together persuaded Emperor Suzong to acquiesce to forcibly moving Emperor Xuanzong, who was then at his preferred subsidiary palace Xingqing Palace (興慶宮), back to the main palace, and exiling Emperor Xuanzong's staff members. However, as of spring 762, when both Emperors Xuanzong and Suzong were seriously ill, Empress Zhang and Li Fuguo had begun to be rivals. (During Emperor Suzong's illness, at one point, to display her love for him, she used her blood to write Buddhist sutras in order to seek blessing for him.) She summoned Li Yu and tried to persuade him to join her in killing Li Fuguo and his ally Cheng Yuanzhen. Li Yu declined, and she instead tried to persuade his younger brother Li Xi (李係) the Prince of Yue, to join her. Li Xi agreed. (Her biographies in Old Book of Tang and the New Book of Tang also indicated that she offered to make Li Xi emperor.) She and Li Xi thereafter had the eunuch Duan Hengjun (段恆俊) select some 200 strong eunuchs, ready to ambush Li Fuguo and Cheng.

On May 14, Empress Zhang issued an order in Emperor Suzong's name, summoning Li Yu. Cheng found out and informed Li Fuguo, who intercepted Li Yu at the palace gate and then escorted him to the camp of the imperial guards under Li Fuguo's command. The guards under LI Fuguo's command then entered the palace and arrested Empress Zhang and Li Xi; the other eunuchs and ladies in waiting fled, leaving Emperor Suzong without care. On May 16, Emperor Suzong died, and Li Fuguo thereafter executed Empress Zhang and Li Xi, as well as Li Xian the Prince of Yan, and then declared Li Yu emperor (as Emperor Daizong). Many of her associates were executed, while Zhang Qing, Zhang Qian, and her uncle Dou Lüxin (竇履信) were exiled. She was posthumously demoted to commoner rank.

== Notes and references ==
- Old Book of Tang, vol. 52.
- New Book of Tang, vol. 77.
- Zizhi Tongjian, vols. 218, 219, 220, 221, 222.

Chinese royalty
Preceded by Empress Wang (Xuanzong)	Empress of Tang dynasty 758–762	Succeeded by Empress Wang (Dezong)
