= Li Fuguo =

Chinese eunuch, military general and politician (704-762)

- Born: 704
- Died: November 12, 762 (aged 57–58)
- Other name: Li Jingzhong
- Occupations: Politician, military general

Li Fuguo (李輔國; 704 – November 12, 762), né Li Jingzhong (李靜忠), known from 757 to 758 as Li Huguo (李護國), formally Prince Chou of Bolu (博陸醜王), was a Chinese eunuch, military general, and politician during the reign of Emperor Suzong (Li Heng) of the Chinese Tang dynasty. He had served Li Heng while Li Heng was crown prince under Li Heng's father Emperor Xuanzong and later supported Li Heng in ascending the throne during Anshi Rebellion, when Emperor Xuanzong's realm was thrown into confusion. He later became exceedingly powerful, in alliance with Emperor Suzong's wife Empress Zhang, but broke with her and killed her in 762 when Emperor Suzong died. He briefly became the paramount figure in the administration of Emperor Suzong's son and successor Emperor Daizong, but was removed and then killed by assassins sent by Emperor Daizong later that year.

== Background ==
Li Jingzhong was born in 704, during the reign of Wu Zetian. He was castrated early in his childhood, and became a servant at the imperial stables. He was said to be ugly in appearance, but knew how to read and write, and eventually became a servant of the powerful eunuch Gao Lishi. When he was in his 40s, he became in charge of the imperial stables' financial accounts. During the Tianbao era (742–756) of Wu Zetian's grandson Emperor Xuanzong, the official Wang Hong (王鉷), who oversaw the imperial stables, was impressed with Li Jingzhong's management of the stables and recommended him to serve on the staff of Emperor Xuanzong's crown prince Li Heng. He soon became a trusted servant of Li Heng's.

In 755, the general An Lushan rebelled against Emperor Xuanzong's rule, and by 756 was approaching the Tang dynasty capital Chang'an, forcing Emperor Xuanzong and Li Heng to flee. During flight, the angry imperial guard soldiers escorting them killed the chancellor Yang Guozhong and his cousin (Emperor Xuanzong's favorite concubine) Consort Yang Yuhuan, whom they blamed for An's rebellion. After Yang Guozhong's and Consort Yang's deaths, Emperor Xuanzong was intent to continue to head to Jiannan Circuit (劍南, modern Sichuan and Chongqing), but Li Heng, at the suggestion of his son Li Tan the Prince of Jianning and Li Fuguo, decided to take some of the soldiers and head for the important border defense post Lingwu, and Li Jingzhong subsequently accompanied Li Heng to Lingwu, where Li Heng was declared emperor (as Emperor Suzong).

== During Emperor Suzong's reign ==
After Emperor Suzong took the throne, while he did not at that point make his oldest son Li Chu the Prince of Guangping crown prince, he gave Li Chu the title of supreme commander of the armies, and he gave Li Jingzhong dual titles on Li Chu's staff—serving as the head of the crown prince's household (太子家令, Taizi Jialing) (although Li Chu was not yet crown prince) and acting assistant of military affairs to the supreme commander (元帥府行軍司馬, Yuanshuai Fu Xingjun Sima). Emperor Suzong entrusted Li Jingzhong with the important secrets, and Li Fuguo became in charge of receiving important reports, as well as distributing military command seals and signs. He also changed Li Jingzhong's name to Huguo (meaning, "one who protects the state"). By this point, Li Huguo ate a vegetarian diet and often acted as Buddhist monks did; further, when he was taking a break, he would often hold prayer beads, and people believed at that point he was benevolent. Later, when Emperor Suzong, while still fighting Yan forces, moved his headquarters from Lingwu to Fengxiang (鳳翔, in modern Baoji, Shaanxi) in spring 757, he gave Li Huguo a slightly greater title as the head of the crown prince's household (太子詹事, Taizi Zhanshi), and changed his name again to Fuguo (meaning, "one who assists the state").

During this time, Li Fuguo had been allied with Emperor Suzong's favorite concubine Consort Zhang, and they had a rivalry with Li Tan and Emperor Suzong's trusted advisor Li Mi. Li Tan often accused Li Fuguo and Consort Zhang of improprieties, and further, despite Li Mi's advice to the contrary, plotted to kill them. Li Fuguo and Consort Zhang, instead, acted first, accusing Li Tan of plotting to kill Li Chu. Emperor Suzong, in anger, ordered Li Tan to commit suicide. Li Chu, in fear, also plotted to kill Li Fuguo and Consort Zhang, although, at Li Mi's urging, stopped the plans.

After joint Tang and Huige forces recaptured Chang'an later in 757 under Li Chu's command, Emperor Suzong returned to Chang'an. He bestowed on Li Fuguo a number of titles that gave him responsibility over a number of financial affairs of the state. He also gave Li Fuguo the honorific title of Kaifu Yitong Sansi (開府儀同三司) and created him the Duke of Cheng. The officials' reports continued to go through Li Fuguo, and Li Fuguo established a bureau with a number of agents with the responsibility of secretly finding out officials' faults. Even criminal cases were ruled on by Li Fuguo, and he was often making orders, in Emperor Suzong's name, reversing officials' decisions. No official dared to speak against him or even to refer to him by official title, instead addressing him as "Master Five," using a form of address from a servant to a master. (This implied that Li Fuguo was probably a fifth-born son.) Even the chancellor Li Kui, who was from a highly honored household, paid him respect as a son or a nephew would, calling him, "Father Five." Emperor Suzong also gave Li Fuguo, despite his eunuch status, the grandnephew of the deceased official Yuan Xisheng (元希聲) as his wife, and promoted Lady Yuan's uncle.

In 759, after Li Xian became chancellor, he secretly and earnestly pointed out to Emperor Suzong the evils that Li Fuguo's secret agents were carrying out, and Emperor Suzong, in response, issued an edict that, while confirming Li Fuguo's past acts as authorized by imperial authority, ordered that in the future, criminal cases were to be decided and appealed through official channels, thus depriving Li Fuguo of a source of power and causing him to be resentful of Li Xian. Later in the year, after Li Xian and Li Fuguo had an open conflict over the criminal charges against an imperial stable official that led to that official's execution, Li Fuguo convinced Emperor Suzong that Li Xian was simply grabbing power, and Emperor Suzong exiled Li Xian.

After Emperor Xuanzong's return to Chang'an, he took residence at Xingqing Palace (興慶宮), which was converted from his residence as an imperial prince. Gao Lishi and the general Chen Xuanli (陳玄禮) attended to him, as did Emperor Xuanzong's younger sister Li Chiying (李持盈) the Princess Yuzhen, the lady in waiting Ru Xianyuan (如仙媛), and the eunuchs Wang Cheng'en (王承恩) and Wei Yue (魏悅). These attendants of Emperor Xuanzong did not respect Li Fuguo. To retaliate, Li Fuguo began to try to convince Emperor Suzong that Emperor Xuanzong and his attendants were plotting to seize power back. In 760, with Emperor Suzong's tacit, although not explicit, approval, on one occasion when Emperor Xuanzong was out riding, Li Fuguo intercepted him and forced him to move back to the main palace. Even on that occasion, however, Gao would not submit to Li Fuguo, and even yelled at Li Fuguo to force him to get off his horse and to escort Emperor Xuanzong on foot, along with Gao. Soon after Emperor Xuanzong was forcibly moved, Li Fuguo forced Chen to retire, Li Chiying to return to her temple (she had become an ordained Taoist nun in 711), and exiled Gao, Wang, Wei, and Ru. Emperor Suzong had his daughters Princesses Wan'an and Xianyi attend to Emperor Xuanzong, but Emperor Xuanzong, depressed over his forced movement and the exile of his attendants, began to be ill. Emperor Suzong regretted this and considered killing Li Fuguo, but feared the fact that Li Fuguo had command of the imperial guards, and therefore did not act.

In 761, Li Fuguo was made the minister of defense (兵部尚書, Bingbu Shangshu), but further wanted to be chancellor. Emperor Suzong, who by this point was fearful of Li Fuguo, refused on the basis that he did not have the support of the officials, Li Fuguo tried to persuade Pei Mian, a senior official who had previously been chancellor, to recommend him. Emperor Suzong told the chancellor Xiao Hua that if an important official (i.e., someone like Pei) recommended Li Fuguo, he would no longer have the excuse to refuse Li Fuguo's request. When Xiao subsequently discussed this with Pei, Pei adamantly stated that he would never allow Li Fuguo to be chancellor. Subsequently, Li Fuguo was not able to be chancellor while Emperor Suzong was alive, much to Li Fuguo's resentment. In 762, bearing a grudge against Xiao, he insisted to Emperor Suzong that Xiao be removed and replaced with Yuan Zai.

Throughout the years, Empress Zhang and Li Fuguo's alliance held. However, as of spring 762, when both Emperors Xuanzong and Suzong were seriously ill, Empress Zhang and Li Fuguo had begun to be rivals. She summoned Li Chu (whose name had been changed to Li Yu and who had been created crown prince) and tried to persuade him to join her in killing Li Fuguo and his ally Cheng Yuanzhen. Li Yu declined, and she instead tried to persuade his younger brother Li Xi (李係) the Prince of Yue, to join her. Li Xi agreed. She and Li Xi thereafter had the eunuch Duan Hengjun (段恆俊) selected some 200 strong eunuchs, ready to ambush Li Fuguo and Cheng. On May 14, Empress Zhang issued an order in Emperor Suzong's name, summoning Li Yu. Cheng found out and informed Li Fuguo, who intercepted Li Yu at the palace gate and then escorted him to the camp of the imperial guards under Li Fuguo's command. The guards under Li Fuguo's command then entered the palace and arrested Empress Zhang and Li Xi; the other eunuchs and ladies in waiting fled, leaving Emperor Suzong without care. On May 16, Emperor Suzong died, and Li Fuguo thereafter executed Empress Zhang and Li Xi, as well as Li Xian the Prince of Yan, and then declared Li Yu emperor (as Emperor Daizong).

== During Emperor Daizong's reign ==
After Emperor Daizong took the throne, Li Fuguo became even more arrogant, stating to him,

You, Emperor, just remain in the palace. Let this old servant of yours handle what is outside.

Emperor Daizong was secretly displeased, but in order to placate Li Fuguo, gave him the title of Shangfu (尚父, "like father") and ordered that he not be referred to by name. He also made Li Fuguo Sikong (司空, one of the Three Excellencies) and Zhongshu Ling (中書令): the head of the legislative bureau of government (中書省, Zhongshu Sheng) and a post considered one for a chancellor. Li Fuguo gave a major part of the command responsibilities to Cheng Yuanzhen. Carrying out further retaliation against Xiao Hua, Li Fuguo had Xiao further demoted.

Meanwhile, though, Li Fuguo did not expect that both Emperor Daizong and Cheng, who wanted more power, would turn against him. In summer 762, at Cheng's secret suggestion, Emperor Daizong issued an edict that stripped Li Fuguo of the titles of minister of defense and assistant of military affairs to the supreme commander—thus stripping him of military command—giving the latter post to Cheng. He also ordered Li Fuguo to leave the palace and take residence up outside, although he created Li Fuguo the Prince of Bolu. Li Fuguo became apprehensive and offered to retire, and Emperor Daizong declined and sent him away with formal respect.

Because Li Fuguo had killed Empress Zhang and had supported him for the throne, Emperor Daizong did not want to kill him openly. Instead, on November 12, 762, an assassin got into Li Fuguo's mansion and killed him, taking his head and an arm away as well. Emperor Daizong formally issued an order seeking the arrest of the assassin, and buried Li Fuguo in a grand ceremony, after having a wooden head and wooden arm carved to be buried with the rest of the body, although he gave Li Fuguo the unflattering posthumous name of Chou (醜, meaning "power abuser").

== Notes and references ==
- Old Book of Tang, vol. 184.
- New Book of Tang, vol. 208.
- Zizhi Tongjian, vols. 218, 219, 220, 221, 222.
