= Yang Guozhong =

Chinese Tang dynasty politician (died 756)

Yang Guozhong (traditional Chinese: 楊國忠; simplified Chinese: 杨国忠; pinyin: Yáng Guózhōng; Wade–Giles: Yang Kuochung) (died July 15, 756), né Yang Zhao (楊釗), was a Chinese politician who served as principal chancellor of the Tang dynasty from 752 to 756, late in the reign of Emperor Xuanzong. Known in his youth as a gambler and wastrel, Yang rose rapidly to political power after his second cousin, Yang Yuhuan, became Emperor Xuanzong's favorite consort in 744. His familial ties and skills as a financial administrator helped him navigate the tumultuous court politics of the late 740s and early 750s to become the emperor's leading chancellor in 752. While Yang enjoyed Emperor Xuanzong's trust, his competence as chancellor was questioned and he became entangled in a fierce rivalry with an erstwhile political ally, the general and imperial favorite An Lushan. Yang was blamed for precipitating An's cataclysmic rebellion in 755. In the following year, he forced the Tang army of Geshu Han, then holding favorable defensive positions in Tong Pass, to confront the rebel army, leading to a rout of Tang forces and the fall of the imperial capital, Chang'an. Yang attempted to flee to his base in Chengdu with Emperor Xuanzong, but when the imperial party stopped at Mawei Station in modern Shaanxi, Yang and his family, including Yang Yuhuan, were massacred by imperial guard soldiers who blamed them for the chaos.

== Background ==
It is unknown when Yang Zhao was born. His family was from Pu Prefecture (蒲州, roughly Yuncheng, Shanxi) and traced its ancestry to the great Han dynasty official Yang Zhen (楊震), as well as officials of Later Yan, Northern Wei, and Sui dynasty. Yang Zhao's great-great-grandfather Yang Wang (楊汪) was an important official during Sui. His grandfather Yang Youliang (楊友諒) served as a county magistrate for Tang, and his father Yang Xun (楊珣) served as a military officer. His mother Lady Zhang was a sister of Wu Zetian's lovers Zhang Yizhi and Zhang Changzong. (Note: However, a story recorded in the Tianbao Tales (天寶故事) by Zheng Shen claimed that Yang Zhao was actually a son of Zhang Yizhi's, with the servant girl Binzhu (蠙珠), but given to his sister to raise to avoid punishment from the jealous Wu Zetian. See Bo Yang Edition of the Zizhi Tongjian, vol. 52 [750]. If this story were true, Yang Guozhong would have been born sometime between 697, when Zhang Yizhi became Wu Zetian's lover, and 705, when Zhang Yizhi and Zhang Changzong were killed and Wu Zetian was overthrown in a coup. In his Zizhi Tongjian Kaoyi, Sima Guang opinioned that the story was a baseless rumour and so he did not include it in Tongjian. The Tianbao Tales claimed that Yang was born during the Tianshou era (690-692) of Wu Zetian's reign.)

Yang Zhao himself was said to lack knowledge and virtues. He was a heavy drinker and gambler, and was looked down upon by his own clan members. Motivated by this slight, Yang decided to join the army, and ended up serving in the army stationed at Yi Prefecture (益州, roughly modern Chengdu, Sichuan). For his military service, he was set to be promoted, but the secretary general of Yi Prefecture, Zhang Kuan (張寬), disliking him, initially refused to do so and in fact whipped him, but eventually he was made the magistrate of Xindu County. After his three-year term of service was over, he did not save sufficient funds to return home, and relied on assistance from a rich man of the region, Xianyu Zhongtong (鮮于仲通). He also spent much time with the household of his father's cousin Yang Xuanyan (楊玄琰), and eventually carried on an affair with one of Yang Xuanyan's daughters (the later Lady of Guo). When Yang Yuanyan, who was sonless, died, Yang Zhao was temporarily in charge of the household, until Yang Yuanyan's daughters went to Henan Municipality (河南府, i.e., Luoyang) to stay with their uncle Yang Xuanjiao (楊玄璬). Yang Zhao later served as the sheriff of Fufeng County (扶風, in modern Xi'an, Shaanxi), but was unable to progress further, and returned to the Yi Prefecture region. While he was in the region, he also married his wife Pei Rou (裴柔), who had been a prostitute.

== Rise to power ==
As of 744, Yang Xuanyan's daughter Yang Guifei had become Emperor Xuanzong of Tang's favorite concubine. Meanwhile, at this time, Xianyu Zhongtong had become an associate of Zhangqiu Jianqiong (章仇兼瓊), the military governor (jiedushi) of Jiannan Circuit (劍南, headquartered in Chengdu), and Zhangqiu happened to be fearful that the powerful chancellor Li Linfu, with whom he was not on good relations, would find some way to hurt him. He thus wanted someone to go to the capital Chang'an to help him maintain good relations with powerful individuals on his behalf. Xianyu recommended Yang Zhao. Zhangqiu gave Yang a gift and also gave him many impressive items from the region and had him take them to Chang'an. Once Yang Zhao arrived at Chang'an, he gave the bribe from Zhangqiu to Consort Yang's sisters and two of her powerful cousins, Yang Xian (楊銛) and Yang Qi (楊錡), and further resumed his affair with one of her sisters. The sisters and cousins of Consort Yang thus repeatedly praised and recommended both Zhangqiu and Yang Zhao, and further pointed out to Emperor Xuanzong Yang Zhao's abilities to entertain by gambling. Yang Zhao was thus allowed in the palace, and subsequently was made an officer of the imperial guards.

As of 747, Yang Zhao was serving as Shi Yushi (侍御史), an imperial censor, when Li Linfu wanted to accuse the official Yang Shenjin (楊慎矜) of crimes. He thus engaged Yang Zhao to have Yang Zhao inform Yang Shenjin's cousin's son Wang Hong (王鉷), who resented Yang Shenjin for still viewing him as a junior member of the family, of Emperor Xuanzong's displeasure with Yang Shenjin over Yang Shenjin's involvement with a sorcerer named Shi Jingzhong (史敬忠). Li Linfu then induced Wang to make accusations against Yang Shenjin, who was a descendant of Sui emperors, of plotting to overthrow Tang and restore Sui. As a result, Yang Shenjin and his brothers Yang Shenyu (楊慎餘) and Yang Shenming (楊慎名) were forced to commit suicide, and many of their friends and family members were exiled. Meanwhile, Li Linfu, having unsuccessfully supported Emperor Xuanzong's son Li Mao (李瑁) the Prince of Shou to be crown prince (with Emperor Xuanzong selecting Li Heng instead), was trying to find ways to undermine Li Heng, and therefore engaged Yang Zhao, Luo Xishi (羅希奭), and Ji Wen (吉溫) to falsely accuse people with connections to Li Heng, hoping to find a way to implicate Li Heng in improprieties. Yang Zhao was therefore able to use this opportunity to destroy several hundreds of households, although, with the eunuch Gao Lishi and Emperor Xuanzong's son-in-law Zhang Ji (張垍) protecting him, Li Heng was not implicated.

As of 748, Yang Zhao carried some fifteen office titles, the chief among which were imperial censor and director of accounting in the ministry of treasury (度支郎中, Duzhi Langzhong). In 748, Emperor Xuanzong further made him Jishizhong (給事中), an imperial attendant, as well as deputy chief imperial censor (御史中丞, Yushi Zhongcheng), but Yang Zhao continued to be in charge of accounting as well at the ministry of treasury. As of 749, with the prefectural treasury's food stores overflowing, Yang suggested that the prefectures, instead of storing food, buy silk with the food and transport the silk to the imperial treasury in Chang'an. Emperor Xuanzong, with Yang reporting record surpluses, took a tour of the imperial treasury with the officials and awarded him with a purple robe and a golden fish.

Meanwhile, by 750, Yang and Ji were allied with each other, and Ji was plotting with Yang how to replace Li LInfu as chancellor—and he found crimes of Li Linfu's close associates Xiao Jiong (蕭炅) and Song Hun (宋渾), and then had Yang indict them and have them demoted, to try to undermine Li LInfu's hold on power. He also sought posthumous rehabilitation of his uncles Zhang Yizhi and Zhang Changzong, and at his request, Emperor Xuanzong posthumously restored the Zhangs' titles (stripped when they had been killed in 705). Also, because there were references in prophecies to a "golden sword" (金刀, which, when put together, made Zhao 釗)), he requested a name change as well. Emperor Xuanzong gave him the new name of Guozhong (meaning, "faithful to the state"). Grateful for what Xianyu had done for him at the start of his career, he had Xianyu made the military governor of Jiannan, despite the fact that Xianyu was harsh and thus offended the non-Han vassals. Indeed, in 751, after Xianyu had attacked the Kingdom of Nanzhao and suffered a major defeat (with 60,000 deaths), Yang hid the truth for him and claimed to Emperor Xuanzong that Xianyu had scored a major victory. Nevertheless, with the Nanzhao campaign continuing, Yang ordered that men be forcibly conscripted, even if they had previously had contributions to the state (which normally would lead to an exemption from conscription). He also had Xianyu offer to resign and recommend him instead; thereafter, Emperor Xuanzong made him the military governor of Jiannan, but he remained at Chang'an and did not report to Jiannan, although he continued to wage the campaign against Nanzhao, eventually with the Tang death toll running up to 200,000.

In 752, Yang received an opportunity to have Li Linfu removed. That year, Wang Hong's brother Wang Han (王銲) had been implicated in a coup attempt at Chang'an, and although Emperor Xuanzong, at the plea of Li LInfu, initially took no action against Wang Hong and Wang Han, he expected Wang Hong to offer to be punished, but Wang Hong did not, drawing Emperor Xuanzong's anger. Li Linfu's fellow chancellor Chen Xilie and Yang then both accused Wang Hong of treason, and Wang Hong was forced to commit suicide, depriving Li Linfu of a major ally. Wang's post as mayor of Jingzhao Municipality (京兆府, encompassing Chang'an) went to Yang. Yang then had the captives from Wang Han's failed coup implicate Li Linfu, and also had Chen and Geshu Han implicate Li Linfu in the rebellion of the ethnically Tujue general Li Xianzhong (李獻忠). Li Linfu tried to defuse the threat by requesting that Yang be sent to Jiannan to personally oversee the Nanzhao campaign, and Emperor Xuanzong sent Yang to Jiannan, despite Yang's pleas and Consort Yang's pleas on his behalf. Emperor Xuanzong, however, promised to make him chancellor, and recalled him as soon as he reached Jiannan. When he returned to Chang'an, Li Linfu was gravely ill, and tried to ingratiate Yang by pointing out that Yang would be chancellor and entrusting his household to Yang. Upon Li Linfu's death, however, Yang induced Li Linfu's son-in-law Yang Qixuan (楊齊宣) into corroborating that Li Linfu was involved with Li Xianzhong. As a result, Li Linfu was posthumously stripped of honors and his family members were exiled.

== As chancellor ==
Meanwhile, Emperor Xuanzong made Yang Guozhong You Xiang (右相) -- the head of the legislative bureau of government (中書省, Zhongshu Sheng) and a post considered one for a chancellor; he also made Yang the minister of civil service affairs (文部尚書, Wenbu Shangshu), and further allowed him to keep his command of Jiannan. It was said that Yang was capable in rhetoric but lacked abilities and presence. While he tried to be a responsible official and was decisive, he was frivolous and insolent to other officials. He personally assumed over 40 posts, and expelled those officials who had good reputations but were not willing to follow his orders. It was further said that he tried to show off his talent by having important matters decided at his home without discussion with other officials, and then simply announce his decisions once he arrived at the government halls. Meanwhile, for his and Chen's contributions in "discovering" Li Linfu's involvement with Li Xianzhong, Emperor Xuanzong created both of them dukes in 753—in Yang's case, the Duke of Wei (魏), although he declined on account that the title was overly honorable for him, and so Emperor Xuanzong made him the Duke of Wei (衛, note different character) -- a slightly lesser title.

Meanwhile, though, Yang began to have discord with another favorite official of Emperor Xuanzong's -- An Lushan, the military governor of Fanyang (范陽, headquartered in modern Beijing), Hedong (河東, headquartered in modern Taiyuan, Shanxi), and Pinglu (平盧, headquartered in modern Chaoyang, Liaoning) Circuits, as An did not respect Yang. Yang repeatedly accused An of plotting rebellion, but Emperor Xuanzong ignored the reports. Yang, instead, entered into an alliance with Geshu, who also disliked An and who was then the military governor of Longyou Circuit (隴右, headquartered in modern Haidong Prefecture, Qinghai) at that time, by recommending that Geshu take over the command of Hexi Circuit (河西, headquartered in modern Wuwei, Gansu).

At this time, Yang and his relatives were living in extreme luxury, and he and the Lady of Guo had connected mansions and were openly displaying their closeness. Meanwhile, whenever Consort Yang's sisters—the Ladies of Guo, Han, and Qin—and Yang Xian and Yang Qi were to attend Emperor Xuanzong and Consort Yang on tours to Huaqing Palace (華清宮, known for its hot springs), their trains would gather at Yang Guozhong's mansion, with each of the five households distinguished by a different color, causing a glamorous display of colors. Yang Guozhong would lead the train ahead with his own guards and the banners as the military governor of Jiannan.

In spring 754, Yang suggested to Emperor Xuanzong that An was set on rebelling, and that if Emperor Xuanzong summoned him to Chang'an, he would surely not come—but when Emperor Xuanzong then did summon An, An immediately arrived at Chang'an and accused Yang of false accusations. Thereafter, Emperor Xuanzong would no longer believe any suggestions that An was plotting rebellion, despite Li Heng agreeing with Yang's assessment on this issue. Meanwhile, he considered promoting An to be chancellor, but Yang opposed, and this did not occur, and An subsequently returned to Fanyang. Meanwhile, Yang was having conflicts with Chen as well, and he forced Chen to resign and then recommended Wei Jiansu to replace Chen. During a subsequent flood that caused much damage, Yang, not wanting any reports of damage, insisted that there was no damage—and when the officials Li Xian and Fang Guan nevertheless submitted damage reports, he had them demoted. He also viewed the official Wei Zhi (韋陟) as a threat and had Wei accused of corruption—and when Wei subsequently bribed Ji, who was by then allied with An, for help, Yang also discovered this and reported it. As a result, Wei and Ji were demoted, and An subsequently submitted a petition on their behalf, claiming that the accusations from Yang were false, but Emperor Xuanzong took no actions against either An or Yang.

In spring 755, however, the matters were beginning to come to a head. When An submitted a petition to have thirty-two non-Han generals under him replace Han generals, Emperor Xuanzong immediately agreed, despite stern arguments from Yang and Wei Jiansu that this was a sign of impending rebellion. Yang and Wei then suggested that An be promoted to be chancellor, and that his three commands be divided between his three deputies; Emperor Xuanzong initially agreed, but after the edict was drafted, Emperor Xuanzong tabled it and instead sent the eunuch Fu Qiulin (輔璆琳) to send fresh fruits to An and to observe him—upon which An bribed Fu into submitting a favorable report. Yang, however, persisted in his reports against Yang, including having the mayor of Jingzhao arrest An's friend Li Chao (李超) and others and executing them secretly. An's son An Qingzong (安慶宗), who was then at Chang'an, reported this to An Lushan, causing An Lushan to be even more apprehensive. Subsequent events—including An's refusal to attend the funeral of an imperial prince in summer 755 and his offer to send a large number of horses to Chang'an in fall 755, began to cause Emperor Xuanzong to start suspecting An. He also discovered that Fu had received An's bribes, and therefore had Fu killed, instead sending another eunuch, Feng Shenwei (馮神威) to Fanyang to again summon An. An refused.

In winter 755, An, finally feeling he had no choice but to rebel, did so. The imperial officials were all apprehensive, because An had the strongest troops of the realm at the time, except for Yang, who believed that An could be suppressed easily. However, An's forces roved through the region north of the Yellow River easily, reaching Luoyang around the new year 756, and capturing it easily despite the efforts of Feng Changqing to defend it. In response, Emperor Xuanzong considered passing the throne to Li Heng and personally lead the troops against An—a proposal that Yang feared, believing that Li Heng would then take actions against the Yangs. He had Consort Yang dissuade Emperor Xuanzong from both actions. Meanwhile, Geshu was summoned to Chang'an to command the forces against An—and Geshu was then able to manufacture evidence that An's stepfather's nephew An Sishun, whom Geshu also disliked, was complicit in An Lushan's rebellion, and An Sishun was executed. Yang, after this incident, began to be apprehensive of Geshu as well. When Geshu subsequently took defensive position at Tong Pass and refused to engage An's forces, reasoning that as long as he kept Chang'an secure, the other generals Li Guangbi and Guo Ziyi would soon be able to capture An's power base at Fanyang and render An harmless. Yang, however, feared that Geshu was instead plotting against him. (Geshu's deputy Wang Sili (王思禮) did suggest to Geshu that he kill Yang when he could, but Geshu refused.) Yang therefore sent his associate Du Qianhui (杜乾輝) with a separate army command to the front as well to watch Geshu, and Geshu, in turn apprehensive that Yang was going to act against him, found an excuse to execute Du, further causing Yang's suspicions. Yang therefore had Emperor Xuanzong order Geshu to engage An's forward commander Cui Qianyou (崔乾祐), despite Geshu's repeated protestations that a battle was inadvisable. Once the armies engaged, Tang forces were crushed by Cui's forces; Geshu was captured, and Tong Pass fell on July 10. (Note: The Zizhi Tongjian recorded that Tong Pass fell to Cui Qianyou on the xinmao day of the 6th month of the 15th year of the Tianbao era of Tang Xuanzong's reign. This date corresponds to 10 Jul 756 in the Gregorian calendar.)

Yang then began to plan for an evacuation to Jiannan. Emperor Xuanzong agreed. On July 14, (Note: According to Xuanzong's biography in the Old Book of Tang, he abandoned Chang'an in the early hours of the yiwei day in the 6th month of the 15th year of the Tianbao era of his reign. This date corresponds to 14 Jul 756 in the Gregorian calendar.) the imperial train, without announcing to the people of Chang'an, left Chang'an, with Emperor Xuanzong attended to by the imperial clan members, Yang, Wei Jiansu, the official Wei Fangjin (魏方進), the general Chen Xuanli (陳玄禮), and eunuchs and ladies in waiting close to the emperor.

On July 15, Emperor Xuanzong's train reached Mawei Station (馬嵬驛, in modern Xianyang, Shaanxi). The imperial guards were not fed and were angry at Yang Guozhong. Chen also believed that Yang Guozhong provoked this disaster and planned to kill him—and reported his plans to Li Heng through Li Heng's eunuch Li Fuguo, but Li Heng was hesitated and gave no approval. Meanwhile, though, emissaries of the Tibetan Empire, who had followed Emperor Xuanzong south, were meeting with Yang Guozhong and complaining that they were also not fed. The imperial guard soldiers took this opportunity to proclaim that Yang Guozhong was planning treason along with the Tibetan emissaries, and they killed him, along with his son Yang Xuan (楊暄), the Ladies of Han and Qin, and Wei Fangjin. Wei Jiansu was also nearly killed, but was spared at the last moment with severe injuries. The soldiers then surrounded Emperor Xuanzong's pavilion, and refused to scatter even after Emperor Xuanzong came out to comfort them and order them to scatter. Chen publicly urged him to put Consort Yang to death—which Emperor Xuanzong initially declined. After Wei Jiansu's son Wei E (韋諤) and Gao Lishi spoke further, Emperor Xuanzong finally resolved to do so. He therefore had Gao take Consort Yang to a Buddhist shrine and allow her a forced suicide, considered a more dignified death than outright execution. After he showed the body to Chen and the other imperial guard generals, the guard soldiers finally scattered and prepared for further movement. Meanwhile, Yang Guozhong's wife Pei Rou, son Yang Xi (楊晞), the Lady of Guo, and the Lady of Guo's son Pei Hui (裴徽) tried to flee, but were killed in flight.

Yang's biography in the Old Book of Tang commented, with regard to Yang's misjudgment of the situation at Tong Pass:

At that time, while An Lushan controlled the Yellow River and Luoyang, his soldiers were only able to reach as far east as the Liang and Song region to the east [(i.e., modern eastern Henan)] and the Xu and Deng region to the south [(i.e., modern southeastern Henan)]. Li Guangbi and Guo Ziyi were leading the best soldiers from north of the Yellow River and had just captured the Heng and Ding region [(i.e., modern central Hebei). If the Yao Mountains [(in modern Sanmenxia, Henan)] and the Hangu Pass could be held and the army not be frivolously used, then the violent rebellion will surely begin to crumble by itself. As soon as Geshu Han was forced to advance, within a few days, the emperor fled, the imperial government fell, the officials were prisoners, the imperial consorts and princesses were killed, the soldiers filled the realm, and the harm damaged the entire empire. This disaster was all caused by Yang Guozhong.

== In fiction and popular culture ==
- Portrayed by Savio Tsang in The Legend of Lady Yang. (2000)
- Portrayed by Du Yuan in The Glory of Tang Dynasty. (2017)
