= Cheng Yi (Tang dynasty) =

Chinese economist and politician

Cheng Yi (程异) (died May 21, 819), courtesy name Shiju (師舉), was a Chinese economist and politician of the Tang dynasty, serving as a chancellor during the reign of Emperor Xianzong. Like colleague Huangfu Bo, he was perceived to have risen to the chancellorship due to his ability to obtain revenues for the emperor, but unlike Huangfu, traditional accounts of his personal character were largely positive.

== Background and early career ==
It is not known when Cheng Yi was born, but it was known that his family was from the Tang dynasty capital Chang'an. According to the table of the chancellors' family trees in the New Book of Tang, the Cheng family claimed ancestry from a Zhou dynasty feudal state of the same name, but no detailed ancestral line of Cheng Yi's was known until his great-grandfather Cheng Sifeng (程思奉), who served as a prefectural prefect. His grandfather Cheng Zigui (程子珪) served as a consultant at the examination bureau of government (門下省, Menxia Sheng), while his father Cheng Xianke (程獻可) served on the staff of a crown prince.

Cheng Yi became known for his filial piety for his service to his father during Cheng Xianke's illness. He later passed the imperial examinations — but in the Mingjing (明經) examinations, not the more prestigious Jinshi (進士) examinations. He later served as a secretary at Hailing County (海陵, in modern Taizhou, Jiangsu). After he further passed a special examination in the rites of the Kaiyuan era (i.e., the rites that were promulgated during the reign of Emperor Xuanzong), he was made the sheriff of Zheng County (鄭縣, in modern Weinan, Shaanxi). He was said to be capable in understanding and applying the regulations properly, and he did so without hesitation. When Du Que (杜確) served as prefect of Tong Prefecture (同州, in modern Weinan) and then as the military governor (Jiedushi) of Hezhong Circuit (河中, headquartered in modern Yuncheng, Shanxi), Cheng served on his staff.

By the end of Emperor Dezong's Zhenyuan era (785-805), Cheng was serving as an imperial censor with the title Jiancha Yushi (監察御史). He was then made the official in charge of the directory of salt and iron monopolies and grain supplies' facility at Yangzi (揚子, in modern Yangzhou, Jiangsu). Around that time, he also became an associate of Wang Shuwen, who was a close associate of then-crown prince Li Song, along with such other junior officials as Wei Zhiyi, Lu Chun (陸淳), Lü Wen (呂溫), Li Jingjian (李景儉), Han Ye (韓曄), Han Tai (韓泰), Chen Jian (陳諫), Liu Zongyuan, Liu Yuxi, and LIn Huai (凌準).

== During Emperor Shunzong's reign ==
Emperor Dezong died in 805, and Li Song, who was by that point himself seriously ill, became emperor (as Emperor Shunzong). Due to Emperor Shunzong's illness, the government was, for a while, effectively run by Wang Shuwen, Wang Pi, Emperor Shunzong's concubine Consort Niu, and the eunuch Li Zhongyan (李忠言). However, Wang Shuwen soon lost power later that year as power became concentrated in the hands of Emperor Shunzong's crown prince Li Chun.

== During Emperor Xianzong's reign ==
Late in 805, Emperor Shunzong yielded the throne to Li Chun (as Emperor Xianzong). Wang Shuwen and his associates were immediately purged from government and exiled. In Cheng Yi's case, he was first made the prefect of Yue Prefecture (岳州, in modern Yueyang, Hunan), and then further demoted to be the military advisor to the prefect of Chen Prefecture (郴州, in modern Chenzhou, Hunan).

By Emperor Xianzong's edict, it was ordered that Wang's associates would not be allowed to move toward Chang'an even if there had been general pardons issued. In 809, however, Li Sun (李巽) the director of salt and iron monopolies and grain supplies submitted a petition pointing out Cheng's talent and requested that he be allowed to put Cheng in charge of the facility at Yangzi. Emperor Xianzong agreed. He was eventually made the director of the two taxes for five circuits, including Huainan (淮南, headquartered in modern Yangzhou). It was said that Cheng spent much his effort in tax reform and was hard working, removing much of the problems that the taxation systems of the Yangtze River-Huai River region was experiencing at the time. He was later recalled to Chang'an to serve as the deputy minister of trade (太府少卿, Taifu Shaoqing), then as minister of trade (太府卿, Taifu Qing), then as minister of armory supplies (衛尉卿, Weiwei Qing), also serving as deputy director of the monopolies and supplies.

As of 817, when Emperor Xianzong was conducting a campaign against the warlord Wu Yuanji, who controlled Zhangyi Circuit (彰義, headquartered in modern Zhumadian, Henan), Cheng was sent out to the Yangtze-Huai region to seek additional revenue. He reviewed the finances of the regions and collected taxes, as well as requested the governors of the region to submit their surplus revenues. It was said that he did so without unduly extracting money from the people. He was thereafter made the director of the monopolies and supplies After Wu was defeated, it was said that Emperor Xianzong became to live wastefully, and that both Cheng and Huangfu Bo the director of finances were finding ways to get him money to allow his lifestyle and thus were favored by him. In 818, Emperor Xianzong made both Cheng and Huangfu chancellors de facto with the title Tong Zhongshu Menxia Pingzhangshi (同中書門下平章事), and also made Cheng the deputy minister of public works (工部侍郎, Gongbu Shilang), over the strenuous objections of the chancellors Pei Du and Cui Qun. Pei, ashamed of serving with Huangfu and Cheng, offered to resign in a petition that attacked Cheng but was much harsher in his attack of Huangfu. Emperor Xianzong did not accept his arguments or his resignation. Still, it was said that Cheng knew that the popular sentiment at the time opposed his ascension, and therefore behaved humbly, and for more than a month did not dare to exercise chancellor authorities.

Meanwhile, Cheng knew that the defenses on the northwest borders with the Uyghur and Tibetan Empires were then poorly run, and he suggested that an official be sent to tour the borders to review the situation. When Emperor Xianzong asked him for a recommendation of someone to send, Cheng volunteered himself. Before the proposal could be finalized, however, Cheng died in 819 without apparent illnesses. He was given posthumous honors and the posthumous name Gong (恭, "respectful"). It was said that he was self-restrained and frugal, and when he died, he did not leave savings for his family, and therefore was much praised.

== Notes and references ==
- Old Book of Tang, vol. 135.
- New Book of Tang, vol. 168.
- Zizhi Tongjian, vols. 236, 237, 240, 241.
