= Zheng Xunyu =

Zheng Xunyu (鄭珣瑜) (738 – December 11, 805), courtesy name Yuanbo (元伯), was a Chinese judge and politician during the Tang dynasty, serving as a chancellor during the reigns of Emperor Dezong and Emperor Shunzong.

== Background ==
Zheng Xunyu was born in 738, during the reign of Emperor Xuanzong. His family was from Zheng Prefecture (鄭州, in modern Zhengzhou, Henan). It claimed ancestry from the ducal house of the Spring and Autumn period state Zheng and traced its ancestry through a line of officials of the Han dynasty, Jin dynasty (266–420), Han Zhao or Later Zhao, Former Yan or Later Yan, Northern Wei, Northern Zhou, and Tang dynasty. His grandfather Zheng Changyu (鄭長裕) served as a prefectural prefect, while his father Zheng Liang (鄭諒) served as a county magistrate.

Zheng Xunyu lost his father prematurely. After the Anshi Rebellion erupted in 755, he took his mother into Mount Luhun (陸渾山, in modern Luoyang, Henan) and supported his mother there, not returning to Zheng Prefecture. After the rebellion was quelled, there were three occasions when the officials Liu Yan and Zhang Xiancheng (張獻誠) recommended him to be an official at the county level, and each time he declined the recommendation. During the Dali era (766–779) of Emperor Xuanzong's grandson Emperor Daizong, Zheng passed the imperial examinations in the special class of those who submitted constructive criticism. He was made Dali Pingshi (大理評事), a judge at the supreme court (大理寺, Dali Si). He was later made the secretary general at Yangzhai County (陽翟, in modern Xuchang, Henan), and, after he served with distinction there, was made the sheriff of Wannian County (萬年, in modern Xi'an, Shaanxi), one of the two counties making up the Tang capital Chang'an.

== During Emperor Dezong's reign ==
After Cui Youfu became chancellor in 779 during the reign of Emperor Daizong's son Emperor Dezong, Cui promoted Zheng Xunyu to be Zuo Bujue (左補闕), a low-level consultant at the examination bureau of government (門下省, Menxia Sheng). He later served as a secretary to the military governor (Jiedushi) of Jingxuan Circuit (涇原, headquartered in modern Pingliang, Gansu), and then returned to Chang'an to serve as an imperial censor with the title Shiyushi (侍御史) then Xingbu Yuanwailang (刑部員外郎), a low-level official at the ministry of justice (刑部, Xingbu). He later left governmental service to observe a mourning period for his mother when she died, and after the mourning period was over, he was moved to the ministry of civil service affairs (吏部, Libu). Early in Emperor Dezong's Zhenyuan era (785–805), he made an order that 10 central government officials be made magistrates of various counties in the Chang'an and Luoyang regions, and Zheng, while retaining his office, was made the magistrate of Fengxian County (奉先, near Chang'an). The next year, he got promoted to the prefect of Rao Prefecture (饒州, in modern Shangrao, Jiangxi), and later returned to Chang'an to serve as Jianyi Daifu (諫議大夫), a high-level consultant; and then was made the deputy minister of civil service affairs (吏部侍郎, Libu Shilang).

Later, Zheng was made the mayor of Henan Municipality (河南, i.e., the Luoyang region). Before he could arrive at Henan, there was a birthday for Emperor Dezong, and it was customary for the mayors of the special municipalities to offer horses as tributes. A subordinate of Zheng's requested that he be permitted to fetch a horse to be offered, but Zheng refused, stating, "It is appropriate for someone who has not started serving to offer tributes?" It was also said that Zheng was serious and quiet in his character, and that he did not ask private favors of others; as a result, people did not dare to ask him for private favors. Once he arrived at Henan, he governed the city without much fanfare, and rested the people by lowering taxes and increasing stipends. At that time, the general Han Quanyi (韓全義) was in charge of attacking the rebel general Wu Shaocheng. Henan was responsible for shipping the army's supplies to Han, and Zheng responded by storing food at Yangzhai, reducing the burden of the people in shipping the supplies. Whenever Han and the eunuchs monitoring the army had demands on Henan, Zheng would not agree with those demands unless there were imperial edicts authorizing them. When his subordinates worried for him that this would offend Han and the eunuchs, Zheng responded:

When generals are on campaigns, they often use that as the excuse to make demands. If my refusal becomes a crime, I, as mayor, will bear the consequences. I will not waste the fruits of the 10,000 laborers.

Zheng's capability in governing the city was compared to a predecessor, Zhang Yanshang, but he was said to be more serious, lenient, and righteous than Zhang. He was later recalled to serve as deputy minister of civil service affairs again. In 803, he was given the designation Tong Zhongshu Menxia Pingzhangshi (同中書門下平章事), making him a chancellor, along with Gao Ying. At that time, one of Emperor Dezong's close associates, Li Shi (李實) the Prince of Dao, was the mayor of Jingzhao Municipality (京兆, i.e., the Chang'an region), and Li was well known for being harsh in his tax collections in order to offer tributes to Emperor Dezong. Zheng, disliking the practice, questioned him:

The revenues of a special municipality need to be properly detailed. Any surpluses should be submitted to the director of finances. Where did your tributes come from?

At that time, however, Li was trusted by Emperor Dezong, and therefore suffered no ill consequences from Zheng's investigation.

== During Emperor Shunzong's and Emperor Xianzong's reigns ==
In 805, Emperor Dezong died and was succeeded by his son Emperor Shunzong. Emperor Shunzong made Zheng Xunyu the minister of civil service affairs (吏部尚書, Libu Shangshu) and still a chancellor. At that time, Emperor Shunzong's close associate Wang Shuwen had become very powerful and was allied with Zheng's chancellor colleague Wei Zhiyi. On an occasion, when the chancellors, as per custom, were having lunch together, Wang wanted to see Wei and went to the office of the chancellors to do so. When a guard refused to let Wang in, Wang rebuked the guard and ordered him away. Wei rose from his seat and walked away to confer with Wang. Zheng, and the other chancellors Du You and Gao Ying, stopped dining and waited for Wei to return. After a while, they sent the guard to see what the situation was, and the guard stated, "Wang Shuwen had requested food, and Chancellor Wei is dining with him." Neither Du nor Gao dared to say anything, but Zheng stated, "How can I remain here still?" He had his attendants fetch horses, and he went home and stayed there for seven days, refusing to leave his bed. Several months later, when Emperor Shunzong, then seriously ill, passed the throne to his son Emperor Xianzong, Zheng and Gao were removed as chancellors. Zheng himself died several months later and was given posthumous honors and the posthumous name Wenxian (文獻, meaning "civil and wise"). His sons Zheng Tan and Zheng Lang later served as chancellors during the reigns of Emperor Wenzong and Emperor Xuānzong, respectively.

== Notes and references ==
- New Book of Tang, vol. 165.
- Zizhi Tongjian, vol. 236.
