= Zheng Yin (Middle Tang) =

Zheng Yin (鄭絪) (752 – December 3, 829), courtesy name Wenming (文明), was a Chinese historian and politician during the Tang dynasty, serving as a chancellor during the reign of Emperor Xianzong.

== Background ==
Zheng Yin was born in 752, during the reign of Emperor Xuanzong. His family claimed ancestry from the ducal house of the Spring and Autumn period state Zheng, and it traced its ancestry to a line of officials of Han dynasty, Jin dynasty (266–420), Han-Zhao or Later Zhao, Former Yan or Later Yan, Northern Wei, and Tang dynasty. His grandfather Zheng Miao (鄭杳) served as a county secretary general, and his father Zheng Xian (鄭羨) served as a prefectural prefect.

Zheng Yin was ambitious in his youth, and was said to be ambitious and capable in writing. During the Dali era (766–779) of Emperor Xuanzong's grandson Emperor Daizong, it was said that he was respected by such well-known Confucian scholars as Zhang Can (張參), Jiang Ai (蔣乂), Yang Wan, and Chang Gun. After he passed the imperial examinations and further passed a special examination for grand speech, he was initially made Xiaoshu Lang (校書郎), a scribe at the Palace Library, and later the sheriff of Hu County (鄠縣), near the capital Chang'an. He was the first emperor.

== During Emperor Dezong's reign ==
During the reign of Emperor Daizong's son Emperor Dezong, when Zhang Yanshang served as the military governor (Jiedushi) of Xichuan Circuit (西川, headquartered in modern Chengdu, Sichuan), he invited Zheng Yin to serve as his secretary. (Note: As Zhang Yanshang served as the military governor of Xichuan from 779 to 785, Zheng's service under him must have taken place during that time. See Old Book of Tang, vol. 129.) Zheng was later recalled to the central government to initially serve as Bujue (補闕), a low-level consultant, as well as Qiju Lang (起居郎), a chronicler of the emperor's acts; he was also involved in editing the imperial history. Soon thereafter, he was made an imperial scholar (翰林學士, Hanlin Xueshi) and made Sixun Yuanwailang (司勳員外郎), a low-level official at the ministry of civil service affairs (吏部, Libu) and was in charge of drafting imperial edicts. It was said that Zheng served in Emperor Dezong's presence for 13 years and that, during that time, he was careful and humble, and that Emperor Dezong treated him well. In 796, there was an occasion when Emperor Dezong, when commissioning eunuch commandants of the imperial Shence Army (神策軍), Dou Wenchang (竇文場) and Huo Xianming (霍仙鳴), was set to issue edicts on hemp paper, when Zheng objected – pointing out that traditionally, only the creation of imperial princes and the commissioning of chancellors involved the use of edicts on hemp paper and questioning whether this would set a dangerous precedent of equating commandants of the Shence Army with such honored individuals. Emperor Dezong agreed and burned the hemp paper edicts, ordering the commissions be issued by the legislative bureau of government (中書省, Zhongshu Sheng) as per regular commissions. The next day, Emperor Dezong told Zheng, "Not even the chancellors dared to resist the eunuchs' requests, and I did not realize this until you brought this up."

== During Emperor Shunzong's reign ==
In spring 805, Emperor Dezong died. Zheng Yin and his colleague Wei Cigong (衛次公) were summoned to the palace to draft a will for him. While they were doing so, a eunuch suddenly stated, "It had not been decided who should be the new emperor." (Emperor Dezong's oldest son Li Song the Crown Prince would be the proper heir legally, but Li Song himself had been debilitated by a stroke in late 804.) It was said that Wei responded and pointed out that Li Song was the proper heir despite his illness and that trouble would come unless Li Song or, as the alternative, Li Song's oldest son Li Chun the Prince of Guangling, were enthroned, and that Zheng agreed with Wei. Li Song thus was able to take the throne (as Emperor Shunzong).

During Emperor Shunzong's brief reign, his close associates Wang Shuwen and Wang Pi, his concubine Consort Niu, and the eunuch Li Zhongyan (李忠言), formed a group of decision-makers, as Emperor Shunzong was unable to speak and himself unable to rule on important matters. It was said that when, in summer 805, Emperor Shunzong summoned Zheng, Wei, and Wang Ya to the palace to draft an edict to create a crown prince, Consort Niu was particularly fearful of Li Chun's decisiveness and did not want to have him created crown prince. Zheng was said to simply write on a paper, "The heir should be the oldest son" and show the paper to Emperor Shunzong. Emperor Shunzong saw what he wrote and nodded. An edict was subsequently issued, making Li Chun crown prince. Later, after Li Chun was named regent, Zheng continued to be imperial scholar but also received the office of Zhongshu Sheren (中書舍人), of a mid-level official at the legislative bureau. In fall 805, Emperor Shunzong passed the throne to Li Chun, who took the throne as Emperor Xianzong.

== As chancellor during Emperor Xianzong's reign ==
Around new year 806, Zheng Yin was promoted to be Zhongshu Shilang (中書侍郎), the deputy head of the legislative bureau, and given the de facto chancellor title of Tong Zhongshu Menxia Pingzhangshi (同中書門下平章事). It was said, however, that at the time fellow chancellor Du Huangchang, who was advising Emperor Xianzong on reforms, especially the wresting of control back from regional warlords, made most of the decisions, and that Zheng was often silent. There was an occasion after Du left office and was replaced by Li Jifu where Li Jifu secretly accused Zheng of having leaked secrets to the warlord Lu Congshi (盧從史), but the imperial scholar Li Jiang pointed out to Emperor Xianzong the implausibility of the accusation, and Emperor Xianzong agreed and did not act on the accusation. Still, with Emperor Xianzong considering Zheng to be too silent and not doing much as chancellor, in 809 Zheng was removed from his chancellor office and made an advisor to the Crown Prince; Zheng was replaced as chancellor with Li Fan. (Note: At the time that Zheng was made advisor to the Crown Prince, there was no crown prince, although Emperor Xianzong's oldest son Li Ning would shortly after be created crown prince.)

== After chancellorship ==
After some time had elapsed, Zheng Yin was made the military governor of Lingnan Circuit (嶺南, headquartered in modern Guangzhou, Guangdong) as well as prefect of Lingnan's capital prefecture Guang Prefecture (廣州), and it was said that Zheng was known for his uncorrupt rule. He was later recalled to serve as minister of public works (工部尚書, Gongbu Shangshu) and the minister of worship (太常卿, Taichang Qing). Yet later, he served as the prefect of Tong Prefecture (同州, in modern Weinan, Shaanxi) as well as the director of Changchun Palace (長春宮). Later, he served as the official in charge of the eastern capital Luoyang. He was then recalled to be the minister of defense (兵部尚書, Bingbu Shangshu) but soon thereafter made the military governor of Hezhong Circuit (河中, headquartered in modern Yuncheng, Shanxi).

In 828, during the reign of Emperor Xianzong's grandson Emperor Wenzong, Zheng was recalled to serve as chief imperial censor (御史大夫, Yushi Daifu) and advisor to the Crown Prince. (Note: However, there was no crown prince at the time, so the latter title was entirely honorary.) As by this point, he was old (76 in age) and weak, he repeatedly requested retirement. Emperor Wenzong thus granted him the title of senior advisor to the Crown Prince and allowed him to retire. He died in late 829 and was given the posthumous name of Xuan (宣, "responsible").

It was said in the Old Book of Tang that Zheng became an official on account of his literary abilities, and that served inside and outside the palace for more than 40 years. He was not known for great accomplishments, but he followed the laws properly. He often spent time on tour with knowledgeable and history-minded persons, and the people respected him for his virtues.
