= Liu Yuxi =

Chinese writer and philosopher (772–842)

- 劉禹錫
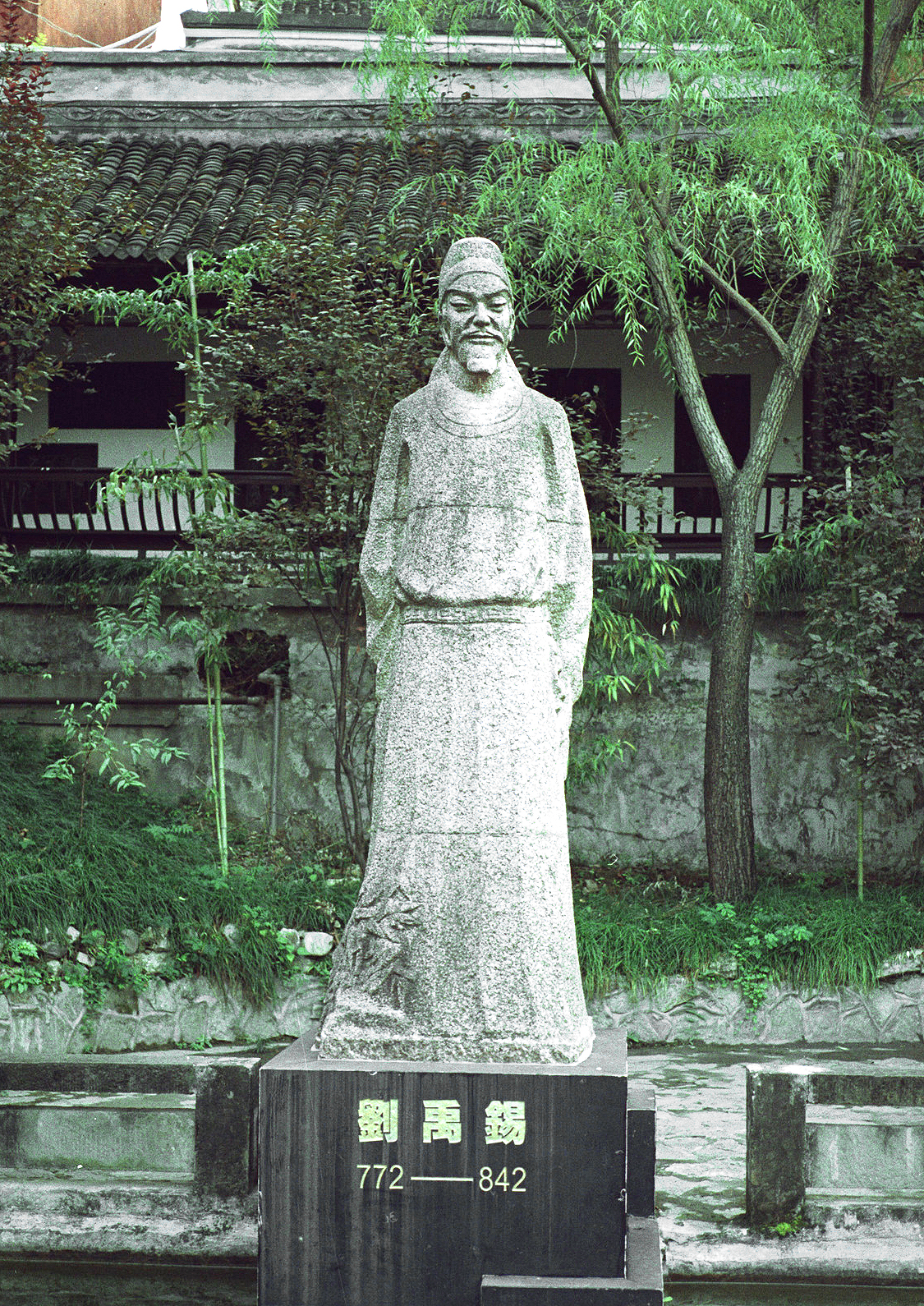
- Statue of Liu Yuxi in Baidicheng
- Born: 772; Luoyang, Henan, China
- Died: 842 (aged 69–70); Luoyang, Henan, China
- Occupation(s): Essayist, philosopher, poet
- Notable work: "The Scholar's Humble Dwelling"

Chinese name
- Traditional Chinese: 劉禹錫
- Simplified Chinese: 刘禹锡
Transcriptions
Standard Mandarin
- Hanyu Pinyin: Liú Yǔxī, Liú Yǔxí
- Wade–Giles: Liu Yü-hsi

Mengde
- Traditional Chinese: 夢得
- Simplified Chinese: 梦得
Transcriptions
Standard Mandarin
- Hanyu Pinyin: Mèngdé
- Wade–Giles: Meng-te

Liu Yuxi (Wade-Giles: Liu Yü-hsi; Chinese: 劉禹錫; pinyin: Liú Yǔxī, Liú Yǔxí; 772–842) was a Chinese essayist, philosopher, and poet active during the Tang dynasty.

== Biography ==
=== Family background and education ===
His ancestors were Xiongnu nomadic people. The putative ‘seventh generation’ family head, Liu Liang, was an official of the Northern Wei (386–534), who followed the Emperor Xiaowen (471–499) when he established the capital at Luoyang in 494. Following the government sinification policy, he became Han and registered his surname as Liu. From then on the family was based in Luoyang.

Liu Yuxi's father, Li Xu, was forced to leave Luoyang to avoid the An Lushan rebellion (755–763) and went to Jiaxing (in the north of present-day Zhejiang Province). Liu Yuxi was born and grew up in the south. In his youth he studied with two renowned poets in Kuaiji (now Shaoxing), the Chan (Zen) monks Lingche (靈澈, 746–816) and Jiaoran (皎然, 730–799), and his later works often reflected this Buddhist sensibility.

=== Early career ===
Names
| Chinese: | 刘禹锡 |
| Pinyin: | Liú Yǔxī |
| Wade-Giles: | Liu Yü-hsi |
| Japanese: | りゅう うしゃく Ryū Ushaku |
| Zì (字): | Mèng dé (梦得; Meng-te in Wade-Giles) |
| Hào (號): | Shī háo (詩豪; Shih-hao in Wade-Giles) |

In 793, Liu passed the jinshi imperial examination. One of the other successful candidates that year was another great poet, Liu Zongyuan, whose career was to be closely connected to that of Liu Yuxi. That same year, Liu Yuxi went on to pass the higher examination (boxue hongceke). In 795, the Ministry of Appointments sent him to be a tutor to the Heir Apparent, a sign that he was destined from a prominent career. However, in 796, his father suddenly died, and he had to return to Yangzhou.

In 800, Liu became a secretary to the important scholar-official Du You who had been made the military governor of Xusihao Circuit, in charge of suppressing an insurrection in Xuzhou, enabling Liu to see army life at first hand. Later he followed Du You to Yangzhou, where he enjoyed the company of the poet Li Yi.

In 802. Liu was transferred to be a registrar (zhubu) in Weinan, Shaanxi. The following year, on the recommendation of an official in the Imperial Censorate called Li Wen, Liu was transferred to the post of investigating censor. At that time, the essayist and poet Han Yu was already also working as an investigating censor, with Liu Zongyuan shortly to join him. These three literary giants of the middle Tang period became friends and were to remain in close contact for the rest of their lives.

=== Yongzhen Reform and banishment ===
In 805, the Emperor Dezong died and was succeeded by his son Shunzong. The government was entrusted to two reformers associated with the new emperor, Wang Shuwen and Wang Pi, 'imperial scholars' of the Hanlin Academy, who initiated the 'Yongzhen Reform' (after the new emperor's reign title). Liu Yuxi and Liu Zongyuan were closely connected to these officials, working immediately under them. However, the emperor was in poor health and after only five months, the powerful eunuchs forced him to abdicate in favour of his son, who became Emperor Xianzong. The reform party lost power, Wang Shuwen was ordered to commit suicide, and the officials connected with the 'Yongzhen Reform' were banished to remote parts of the empire.

Liu Yuxi was sent to Lianzhou in Guangdong to be the local governor, then redirected, in a further demotion, to Langzhou in Hunan. Liu Zongyuan was sent to Yongzhou, another city in the same province. Others in the same group of banished officials included Wei Zhiyi, Cheng Yi, Han Ye (韓曄), Han Tai (韓泰), and Ling Zhun (凌准).

=== Second period of banishment and subsequent recall ===
In 815, Liu and the other Yongzhen reformers were recalled to the capital. Early the following year, he reached Chang'an, the capital, and unrepentantly wrote a poem with a veiled satire on court politics (The Peach Blossoms of Xuandu Temple 玄都觀桃花) that helped earn him another immediate banishment. Liu was to be sent to be the prefect of Bo (播州, in modern Zunyi, Guizhou), but as this would have been too hard a living place for Liu's mother, Liu Zongyuan offered to go there instead. Finally Pei Du, the deputy chief imperial censor (御史中丞, Yushi Zhongcheng), persuaded the emperor that Liu could be the local governor in Lianzhou in Guangdong, while Liu Zongyuan was sent to Liuzhou in Guangxi. In 821, Liu was again transferred to Kuizhou (on the Yangtze River), then transferred to another post at Hezhou (Guangxi).

In 826, Liu was again recalled, this time to Luoyang, ending the long period of his banishment from the court. In 827, he was given a post in the government, becoming a director (langzhong) of a bureau the following year. With the support again of the (then) Chancellor Pei Du, Liu was once again promoted to be an Academician (Jixianxueshi 集贤院学士), a post that lasted for four years, during which he was able to associate with Pei Du, Cui Qun and the poet Bai Juyi. In 828, he was able to visit Changan, where he wrote the poem Visiting Xuandu Temple Again (再遊玄都觀 Zài Yóu Xuándū Guān), noting that the peach trees had all disappeared, since his previous visit 14 years earlier.

=== Later career ===
In 830, Pei Du resigned as chancellor, and Liu was again given a provincial post, this time as governor in Suzhou, where his work on flood control was particularly appreciated. The local people designated him, with Wei Yingwu and Bai Juyi, as one of the ‘Three Worthies’ (三贤 sanxian), later to be commemorated in the ‘Three Worthies Hall’ (三贤堂). After Suzhou, he was posted to Ruzhou (in Henan) and Tongzhou (in Shaanxi).

In 836, he left Tongzhou to take up a nominal post in the household of the Heir Apparent in Luoyang. In 841, he also became an ‘Acting Adviser’ to the director of the Board of Rites (Jianjiao Libu Shangshu 检校礼部尚书). At that time Bai Juyi was also in retirement in Luoyang and the two old poets were able to spend time together. Liu Yuxi died in the autumn of 842 at the age of 71. He was given the posthumous rank of ‘Minister of Revenue’ (Hubu Shangshu 户部尚书).

== Poetry ==
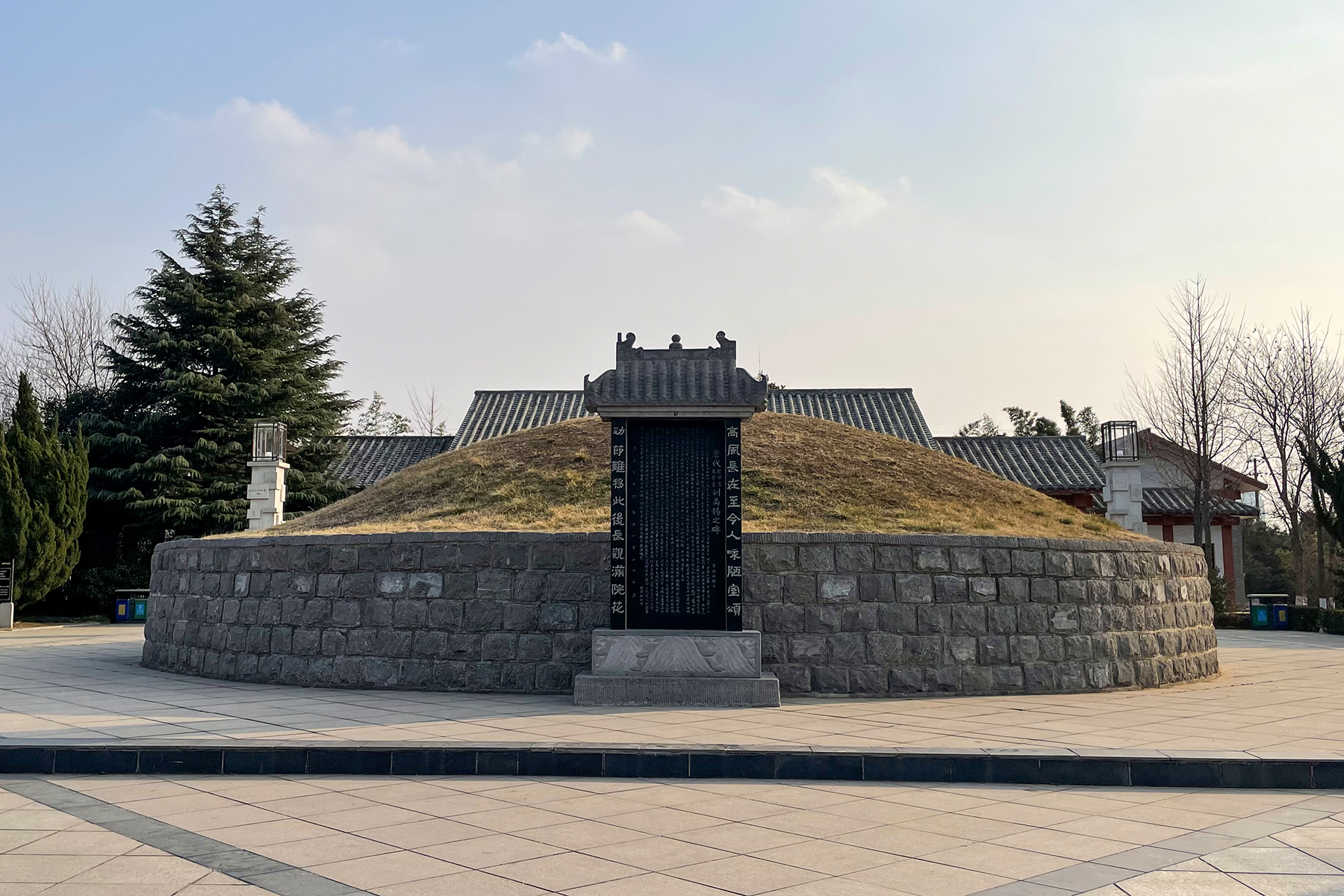
Tomb of Liu Yuxi in Xingyang, Henan

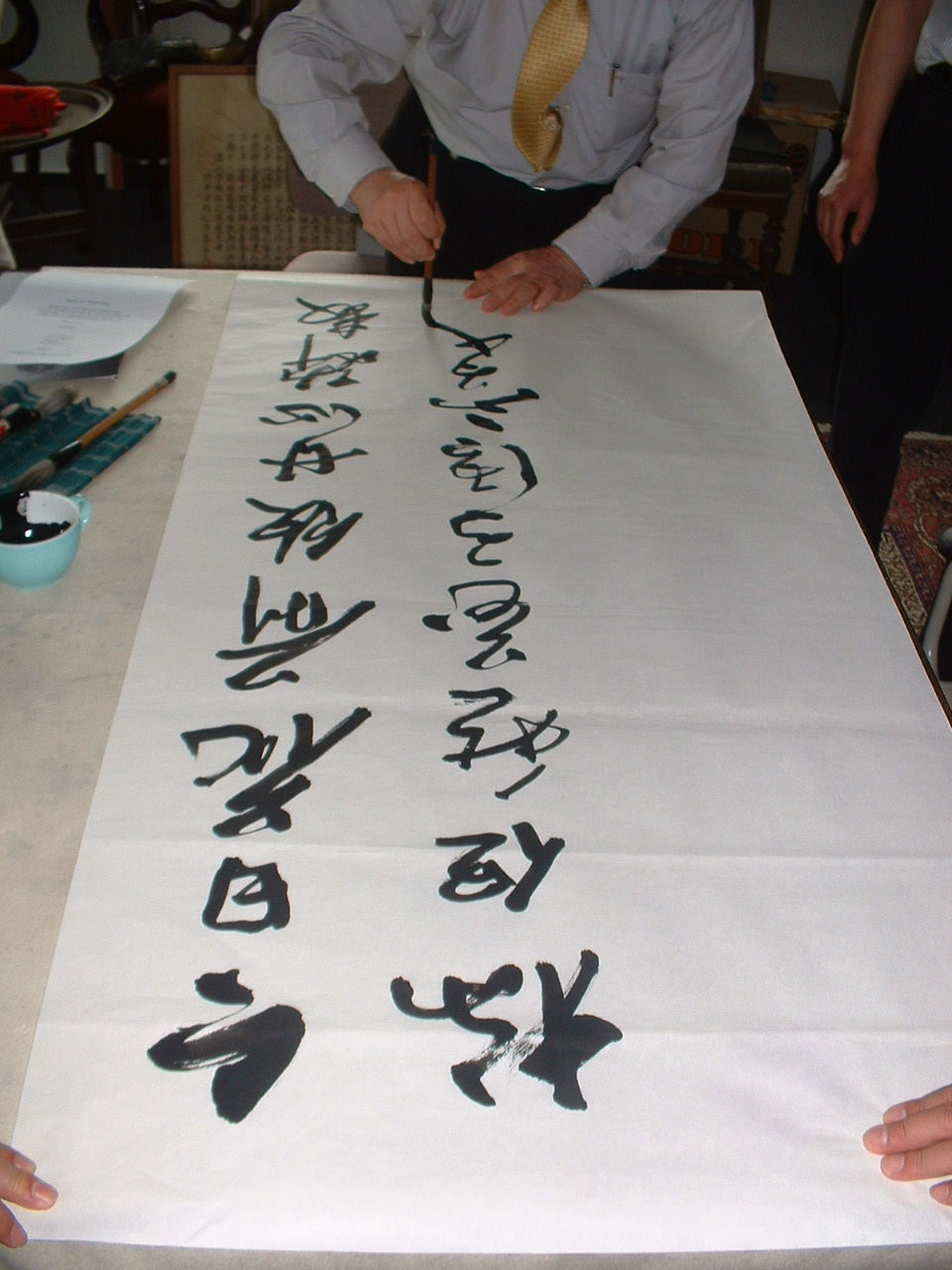
Calligraphy of a poem by Liu Yuxi

Liu Yuxi's wide interests are reflected in the subject matter of his poetry: the economic and social customs of ordinary people and their problems, folk music and folklore, friendship, feasting and drinking, and historical themes and nostalgia for the past. Some of the best known are notable for their simple, 'folksong' style. Just over 700 of his poems still exist, four of them are included in the classic Qing dynasty anthology Three Hundred Tang Poems, which was first published in the 18th century.

He excelled in the shorter, more complex forms of Chinese poetry. In technical terms, he preferred using heptasyllabics (seven character lines) to pentasyllabics (five character lines) (123 to 47 examples in Wu Zaiqing's edition of selected works), regulated rather than unregulated (145 to 22 examples in Wu), and short forms (8-line lüshi and 4-line jueju) to longer poems (142 to 25 examples in Wu).

He was a close friend and colleague of three great contemporary poets: Liu Zongyuan, Han Yu and Bai Juyi. Bai was born in the same year as Liu Yuxi and referred to "Liu and Po, those two mad old men" in at least one poem dedicated to Liu.

=== English translations ===
Two of Liu's poems were included in one of the first collections of English translations of Chinese literature: Herbert Giles's 1898 Chinese Poetry in English Verse:

秋風引 Summer Dying

何处秋风至？ Whence comes the autumn's whistling blast,
萧萧送雁群。 With flocks of wild geese hurrying past? . . . .
朝来入庭樹， Alas, when wintry breezes burst,
孤客最先闻。 The lonely traveller hears them first!

和乐天春词 The Odalisque

新妆宜面下朱楼， A gaily dressed damsel steps forth from her bower,
深锁春光一院愁。 Bewailing the fate that forbids her to roam;
行到中庭数花朵， In the courtyard she counts up the buds on each flower,
蜻蜓飞上玉搔头。 While a dragon-fly flutters and sits on her comb.

A more recent translator, Red Pine (Bill Porter) has translated Ode to the Autumn Wind (秋风引 Qiūfēng yǐn, the same poem as Giles's Summer Dying above), The Peach Blossoms of Hsuantu Temple (玄都觀桃花 Xuándū Guàn Táohuā), and Visiting Hsuantu Temple Again (再遊玄都觀 Zài Yóu Xuándū Guān).

=== Loushi Ming ===
One of his most famous works is 'Loushi Ming' 陋室銘, "The Scholar's Humble Dwelling", a prose-poem describing living in a simple dwelling, following a life that is refined in culture and learning:

山不在高， Who heeds the hill's bare height until
有仙則名； Some legend grows around the hill?
水不在深， Who cares how deep the stream before
有龍則靈。 Its fame is writ in country lore?
斯是陋室， And so this humble hut of mine
惟吾德馨。 May shelter virtues half divine.
苔痕上階綠， The moss may climb its ruined stair,
草色入簾青。 And grassy stains the curtain wear,
談笑有鴻儒， But scholars at their ease within,
往來無白丁。 For all but Ignorance enters in,
可以調素琴， With simple lute the time beguile,
閱金經。 Or "Golden Classic's" page a while.
無絲竹之亂耳， No discords here their ears assail,
無案牘之勞形。 Nor cares of business to bewail.
南陽諸葛廬， This is the life the Sages led.
西蜀子雲亭。
孔子云：「何陋之有？」 "How were they poor?" Confucius said.

(Translated by James Black.)

== Philosophy ==
Li Yuxi was involved in a philosophical debate with his fellow literati, the poets Han Yu and Liu Zongyuan, concerning the duality of heaven (the sky, and by extension the natural world or God) and earth (the world of man). Han Yu, as a Confucian, regarded Heaven as paramount, whereas Liu Zongyuan regarded them as separate spheres. Lu Yuxi's view, expressed in an essay called the Tianlun Shu (Tiānlùn shū 天論書), was that heaven and earth (i.e. nature and man) interacted to some degree. Heaven sometimes predominated over earth, and earth sometimes predominated over heaven.
