= Gong Shi =

Monetary policy in Tang China

- Traditional Chinese: 宮市
- Simplified Chinese: 宫市
- Literal meaning: the Emperor's purchasing
Transcriptions
Standard Mandarin
- Hanyu Pinyin: Gōng Shì
- Bopomofo: ㄍㄨㄥ ㄕˋ

Gong Shi (Chinese: 宮市; pinyin: Gōng Shì) (Note: Gōng, 'Emperor' (lit. 'palace') + Shì, 'buy' = Gōng Shì, 'the Emperor's purchasing') was a policy in ancient China during the reigns of emperors Dezong (唐德宗) and Shunzong (唐順宗) of the Tang dynasty in which the emperor would send eunuchs to civilian markets to purchase goods by force at very low prices. This system was abolished by Reformists led by Wang Shuwen (王叔文) under the rule of Emperor Shunzong.

== History ==
Researches published by City University of Hong Kong and Fudan University show that the earliest record of Gong Shi can be traced back to 707, according to two biographic sketches of Emperor Zhongzong (Chinese: 唐中宗). At first, the Gong Shi was merely certain kind of imperial entertainment, until the period of the Emperor Xuanzong (Chinese: 唐玄宗), when the entertainment tended to become a commercial practice adopted to serve the need of the palace.

Before the Zhenyuan (Chinese: 貞元) period of the reign of Emperor Dezong, if the palace required supplies, then the officials responsible for procurement would settle the bill immediately after a purchase. Originally, these officials were called The Envoy of Imperial purchasing (Chinese: 內中市買使; pinyin: nèizhōng shìmǎi shǐ), but later they were renamed the Envoy of Emperor's purchasing (Chinese: 宮市使; pinyin: gōngshì shǐ).

At that time, the purchase and management of charcoal, which was the main fuel for the imperial household, was part of the daily operations of the whole palace in the Tang dynasty. Various officials were appointed to act as The Envoy of Charcoal Purchasing (Chinese: 木炭使; pinyin: mùtàn shǐ). At first, the eunuchs were simply The Envoys of Emperor's purchasing, whose responsibility did not include buying charcoal, but this changed as the eunuchs' power increased during a period which saw power struggles among the officials of court, and the role of The Envoy of Charcoal Purchasing slowly merged with their existing duties. Charcoal was only one commodity among many that were plundered by the government using the Gong Shi practice.

Because of this, the imperial family started sending eunuchs to make purchases towards the end of the Zhenyuan period and the practice of purchasing goods at low prices began to develop, and even the official documents needed to permit and justify such purchases gradually vanished. Although the Expostulatory Officials (Chinese: 諫官; pinyin: jiǎn guān) often suggested that Emperor Dezong should abolish Gong Shi, he did not do so.

== Implementation ==
The implementation of Gong Shi basically involved shops operated by eunuchs within the palace. Taking advantage of imperial power to bully the citizens, these eunuchs would often send men to markets located at both the east and west part of the city, or the main road which was the only way people could pass to arrive at their destination, to enforce the deals. The traders received extremely poor payments and were subsequently ordered to transport their merchandise to the palace.

At the time, there could hundreds of people buying goods at low prices by force at various markets in the capital city Chang'an (Chinese: 長安) – often a few hundred Qian (Chinese: 錢; pinyin: qián) were used to purchase goods worth thousands, or, in some cases, there might be no payment at all. The civilian traders dared not resist or even ask where these officials were from, even though there were often doubts as to the identities of the purchasers.

The Chronicle of Shunzong period (Chinese: 順宗實錄; pinyin: shùnzōng shílù) written by Han Yu (Chinese: 韓愈) recorded such an incident: while a peasant was going to the town carrying firewood he wanted to sell in the market, he met a eunuch claiming the firewood had already been bought by the emperor (through the Gong Shi system) and simply paying him a few chi of juan (Chinese: 絹; pinyin: juān), a type of silk product. The eunuch then ordered the peasant to transport the firewood to the imperial palace using his donkey and even asked for an Entrance tip (Chinese: 門戶錢; pinyin: ménhù qián). All these demands upset the peasant; he gave the juan back and begged for mercy, but the eunuch insisted that he transport the firewood. In the end, the peasant assaulted the eunuch out of frustration and was arrested by a patrolling officer. Hearing of this event, Emperor Dezong dismissed the eunuch responsible by sending out an imperial decree and presented ten pieces of juan to the peasant.

Although historical documents recording such events in detail can hardly be found today, scholastic researches generally used the terms rob (Chinese: 搶), seize (Chinese: 奪), pillage (Chinese: 掠奪) or take by force (Chinese: 搶奪) in Chinese to describe the eunuchs' misdeeds negatively.

== Abolition ==
Shortly after his accession, Emperor Shunzong began to reappoint the Reformists, the leader of whom was Wang Shuwen. The Reformists implemented a series of policies, including the abolition of Gong Shi and the Scoundrels in the Five Workshops (zh:五坊小兒, pinyin: wǔfǎng xiǎoér), which acted as tools to oppress the civilian population.

== Criticism ==
Sinologist Chen Yinke said "Gong Shi was the worst policy in the late Emperor Dezong period" in his book the Draft of Album Verses of Yuanbai (Chinese: 元白詩箋證稿; pinyin: yuánbái shījàn zhènggǎo).

Han Yu wrote in the Chronicle of Shunzong period: "although called Gong Shi, it was actually a robbery."

Modern Chinese scholar Zhang Lifan said in an essay: "during his early years, Emperor Dezong knew it was wiser to be thrifty. But when grew older, he became more and more avaricious and wasteful. At the same time, the extent of civilians' sufferings from Gong Shi largely increased."

== Literature ==
苦宮市也...一車炭，千余斤，宮使驅將惜不得。
半匹紅綃一丈綾，系向牛頭充炭直。

— 白居易，《賣炭翁》。

In the poem the Old Charcoal Seller (Chinese: 賣炭翁; pinyin: mài tàn wēng), the famous ancient Chinese poet Bai Juyi (Chinese: 白居易) satirized the phenomenon of officials buying goods by force at low prices by Gong Shi, with a note below the title of the poem: "so suffering from the Gong Shi" (Chinese: 苦宮市也; pinyin: kǔ gōngshì yě).

=== Related works ===
- Bai Juyi, the Old Charcoal Seller
- Han Yu, the Chronicle of Shunzong period

== See also ==
- The Scoundrels in the Five Workshops (zh:五坊小兒), an offensive word once used to describe workers in the five imperial workshops.

== Notes ==
Note

Bibliography

- Fu Lecheng (傅樂成), the General history of China - the history of Sui, Tang, and the Five Dynasties and Ten Kingdoms period (《中國通史 隋唐五代史》), Zhongwen Book Co., Ltd (眾文圖書公司), ISBN 957-532-033-6
