= Du clan of Jingzhao =

Notable Chinese family

Du 杜
- Clan
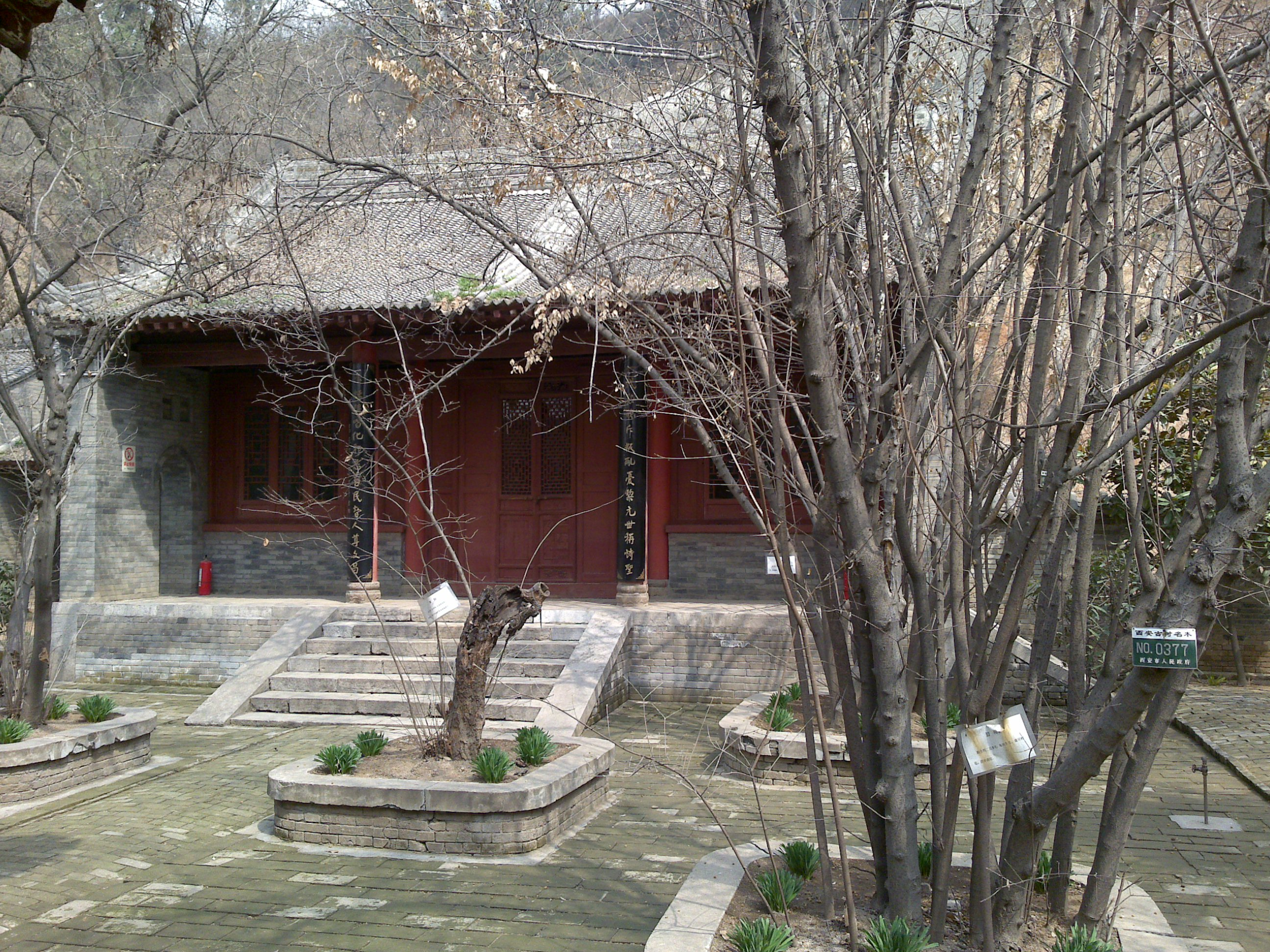
- Du Gong Temple, ancestral hall of Du Fu in Xi'an, Shaanxi
- Origin: Jingzhao county
- Founded: Western Han
- Founder: Du Zhou
- Titles: Various
- Dissolution: late Tang dynasty and Five Dynasties and Ten Kingdoms period (c. 900s AD)

The Du clan of Jingzhao (Chinese: 京兆杜氏) was a prominent Chinese clan, centred around the Jingzhao region (modern day Xi'an). Tracing its origins back to the Western Han dynasty, it retained its prominence in Chinese politics and society up to the end of the Tang dynasty.

== History ==
=== Han dynasty ===
The Du clan traces its ancestry to Du Zhou (d. 94 BC), who served as a censor in the Western Han dynasty under Emperor Wu of Han, and his son Du Yannian, who also served as a chief censor and shifted the clan's base to Duling (in modern-day Xi'an). After this, however, the Du family appears not to have been deeply involved in politics during the Eastern Han.

=== Three Kingdoms period and Jin dynasty ===
The Du family regained prominence in government during the late Han period with Du Ji, who came to the attention of Cao Cao via Xun Yu and became a renowned governor of Hedong Commandery (modern day southern Shanxi). His son, Du Shu, also became a regional governor, and Du Shu's son Du Yu became the chief commander of the conquest of Wu by Jin.

In the wake of the Disaster of Yongjia, when the Western Jin capital at Luoyang was sacked, the Du clan generally did not embark on the southern migration to the Eastern Jin that was undertaken by many other prominent clans, instead choosing to remain in northern China and to serve the succeeding non-Chinese regimes. They retained their prominence even during the tumultuous period of the Five Barbarians, and are reported as filling important military and political posts after moving east into Later Zhao.

An exception to the trend of remaining north was Du Yi (杜乂), who achieved fame as an elegant gentleman in the Eastern Jin court, but died without issue.

=== Tang dynasty ===
During the Tang dynasty, members of the Du clan played an important role in both governance and culture. The Tongdian, an encyclopedic account of governmental institutions through to the An–Shi Rebellion, was compiled by Du You. Many military governors(jiedushi) during the Tang dynasty were part of the Du clan. Such examples include Du Shenquan, Du Rangneng and Du Hong.

== Prominent members ==
- Du Yu (222–285), general of Cao Wei and Jin and the conqueror of Eastern Wu
- Du Ruhui (585–630), chancellor under Emperor Taizong of Tang
- Du Fu (712–770), poet and politician
- Du You (735–812), Tang dynasty chancellor
- Du Rangneng (841–893), former jiedushi during the Tang dynasty
- Du Mu (803–852), poet, grandson of Du You
