= Empress Dowager Wang (Xianzong) =

Empress Dowager Wang 王太后
- Empress Zhuangxian (莊憲皇后)

Empress Dowager of the Tang dynasty
- Reign: 806 - April 5, 817
- Predecessor: Empress Dowager Wei
- Successor: Empress Dowager Guo

Retired Empress of the Tang dynasty
- Reign: 805 - February 11, 806
- Predecessor: None
- Successor: Empress He
- Born: 763
- Died: April 5, 817
- Spouse: Emperor Shunzong of Tang
- Issue: Emperor Xianzong of Tang; Li Chang, Princess Hanyang; Li Zixu, Princess Lianggongjing; Li Wan, Prince of Fu; Princess Yun'an
Posthumous name
- Empress Zhuangxian (莊憲皇后)
- Clan: Wang (王) (by birth); Li (李) (by marriage)
- Father: Wang Yan (王顏)

Empress Dowager Wang (王太后, personal name unknown) (763 – April 5, 817), formally Empress Zhuangxian (莊憲皇后, "the mighty and knowledgeable empress"), was an empress dowager of the Chinese Tang dynasty. She was the mother of Emperor Xianzong.

== Background ==
The future Empress Dowager Wang was born in 763, during the reign of Emperor Daizong. Her family was from the Langya Clan (琅邪, in modern Linyi, Shandong). Her grandfather Wang Nande (王難得) was said to have had well-known accomplishments. Her father was named Wang Yan (王顏).

When she was young, she was selected to be an imperial consort with the rank of Cairen (才人). However, because she was very young, in 775, Emperor Daizong gave her to his grandson Li Song, who had not yet been given a princely title and who was 14 at the time.

== As princely consort ==
In 778, the future Empress Dowager Wang gave birth to Li Song's oldest son Li Chun, and in 779, when Li Song was created the Prince of Xuan, she was given the rank of Ruren (孺人) as a princely consort. When, later in the year, he was created Crown Prince (with Emperor Daizong's son and Li Song's father Emperor Dezong being emperor at that point), she was given the rank of Liangdi (良娣). It was said that she was respectful and careful, and the people in the palace praised her for her virtues.

== As imperial consort ==
In 805, Emperor Dezong died, and Li Song became emperor (as Emperor Shunzong). Just prior to Emperor Dezong's death, Emperor Shunzong himself had suffered a debilitating stroke, leaving him partially paralyzed and unable to speak. It was said that Consort Wang carefully attended to his medical needs and rarely left his presence. It was also said that he wanted to create her empress, but because he was unable to speak, the creation never took place.

== As retired empress ==
Later in 805, Emperor Shunzong yielded the throne to Li Chun, who had been created Crown Prince (as Emperor Xianzong). Emperor Xianzong honored Emperor Shunzong as Taishang Huang (retired emperor), and Consort Wang as Taishang Huanghou (太上皇后, "retired empress").

== As empress dowager ==
Emperor Shunzong died in 806, and Emperor Xianzong thereafter honored Retired Empress Wang as Empress Dowager. She took up residence at Xingqing Palace (興慶宮). It was said that she had a kind, peaceful, respectful, and humble disposition, and she did not allow her family members to take power. She died in 816 and was buried at the same tomb as Emperor Shunzong.

== Notes and references ==
- Old Book of Tang, vol. 52.
- New Book of Tang, vol. 77.
- Zizhi Tongjian, vols. 236, 237, 239.
