= Wang Shuwen =

Tang Chinese economist and politician (753–806)

Wang Shuwen 王叔文
- Born: 753
- Died: 806 (aged 52–53)
- Occupation: Economist, politician

Wang Shuwen (Chinese: 王叔文; born 753, died 806) was a Chinese economist and politician during the Tang dynasty. He was a close associate of Emperor Shunzong (Li Song) while Li Song was crown prince under his father, Emperor Dezong, and was powerful during Emperor Shunzong's brief reign in 805, when Shunzong was severely ill. However, he offended the powerful eunuchs and further lost power when he was forced to leave governmental service due to his mother's death, and after Emperor Shunzong yielded the throne to his son Xianzong, Wang was ordered to commit suicide.

== Background and service under Li Song as Crown Prince ==
Wang Shuwen was born in 753. His family was from Yue Prefecture (越州, in modern Shaoxing, Zhejiang). It was said that during the reign of Emperor Dezong, he became a reserve consultant in the imperial administration on the basis of his abilities in Go, rough knowledge in the books, and speaking ability. Emperor Dezong had him become a member of the staff of Emperor Dezong's son and crown prince Li Song. It was said that Wang was, when he was having chances, bringing to Li Song's attention of the suffering of the people. At one point, Li Song was studying with several scholars who were teaching him in various matters, and they began to discuss one of the institutions of Emperor Dezong's court that was much criticized — "the Emperor's purchasing" (宮市), where palace eunuchs "bought" items for palace supplies, but effectively were forcibly taking things from merchants and paying either nothing or very little. Li Song indicated that when he had a chance, he would try to talk to Emperor Dezong to suggest ending the process. The scholars all praised Li Song, but Wang, who was also present did not say anything. After the scholar had left, Wang told Li Song that if he actually made such suggestions to Emperor Dezong, Emperor Dezong would suspect him of attempting to please the people. Li Song saw Wang's point and wept, and thereafter became more trusting of Wang. Meanwhile, Wang and another staff member of Li Song's, Wang Pi, who was known for his calligraphy, became close associates.

As time went by, Wang Shuwen gradually recommended to Li Song a group of junior officials with reputations for abilities whom he believed could eventually be high level officials or generals, and whom he had befriended. Such junior officials included Wei Zhiyi, Lu Chun (陸淳), Lü Wen (呂溫), Li Jingjian (李景儉), Han Ye (韓曄), Han Tai (韓泰), Chen Jian (陳諫), Liu Zongyuan, Liu Yuxi, Ling Zhun (凌準), and Cheng Yi. It was said that they would spend their days together in secret and that the contents of their deliberations were not openly known. Some regional governors, believing that this would be the next group of officials to take power, sent them gifts. By 803, this group was said to be powerful enough that, when they suspected another junior official, Zhang Zhengyi (張正一) of making negative reports about Wang Shuwen to Emperor Dezong, they had Wei accuse Zhang of being wasteful and engaging in partisanship. As a result, Zhang and his associates Wang Zhongshu (王仲舒) and Liu Bochu (劉伯芻) were exiled without any publicly announced faults.

== During Emperor Shunzong's reign ==
In late 804, Li Song suffered a debilitating stroke that left him partially paralyzed and unable to speak. When Emperor Dezong died on February 25, 805, there were initially some eunuchs who suggested that someone else should succeed Emperor Dezong, but at the strong advocacy of the imperial scholar Wei Cigong (衛次公), Li Song's succession was not further questioned despite his illness. To show that he was still not completely incapacitated, Li Song was forced to personally show himself to the imperial guards, and he took the throne (as Emperor Shunzong).

However, Emperor Shunzong remained seriously ill, and he was often attended to only by the eunuch Li Zhongyan (李忠言) and his concubine Consort Niu. Much of the decisions on important matters of state were entrusted to Wang Pi and Wang Shuwen, both of whom were named imperial scholar and was largely making decisions at the Hanlin Institute (翰林院). Under Wang Shuwen's recommendation, Wei Zhiyi was made a chancellor, and it was said that Wei, Wang Shuwen, Wang Pi, Li Zhongyan, and Consort Niu formed a group of decision makers. It was said that much authority were also delegated to Han Tai, Liu Zongyuan, and Liu Yuxi, and that Wang Shuwen was effectively the leader. His associates were also said to be praising each other and comparing each other to such great historical figures as Yi Yin, the Duke of Zhou, Guan Zhong, and Zhuge Liang. Many officials were being promoted and demoted based on their recommendations. Meanwhile, Wang Shuwen, believing that the key to getting the support from the soldiers and the people to affirm their power was control over the imperial treasury, had himself made the deputy director of finances, serving under the senior chancellor Du You. Wang Shuwen was said to be so insolent in his exercise of power that, at one point, breaching the protocol that chancellors were to have lunch together, he demanded that Wei meet him during lunch time — angering Wei's senior colleague Zheng Xunyu so much that Zheng went home and refused to exercise chancellor responsibilities from that point on.

With Emperor Shunzong's severe illness, there was a popular sentiment among officials that Emperor Shunzong's oldest son Li Chun should be made crown prince as soon as possible. It was said, though, that Wang Shuwen and his associates — especially Consort Niu, who was not Li Chun's mother — were apprehensive about Li Chun, who was known for his being intelligent and decisive. One of the imperial scholars, Zheng Yin, however, directly proposed to Emperor Shunzong that LI Chun be created crown prince by writing the proposal on paper and showing it to Emperor Shunzong. After Emperor Shunzong nodded to show approval, Li Chun was created crown prince on April 26. At Li Chun's creation ceremony, Wang Shuwen was said to be so concerned about Li Chun's accession that, while he did not say anything directly, he was heard reading from Du Fu's poem about Zhuge — "He had not even succeeded in his campaigns when he died. This often caused heroes to weep onto their collars."

Meanwhile, though, Wang Shuwen had begun to draw the displeasure of the powerful eunuch Ju Wenzhen (俱文珍). In summer 805, when Wang Shuwen, wanting to strip the control of the imperial Shence Army from the eunuchs, had the general Fan Xichao (范希朝) made the commanding general of the Shence Army soldiers at the western frontier with Han Tai as his deputy, the eunuchs were alarmed. Ju had Wang Shuwen promoted in title to be the deputy minister of census (戶部侍郎) — but stripped of his imperial scholar status, making it impossible for him to be making decisions at Hanlin Institute. Wang Pi tried to intercede, but was only able to have Wang Shuwen allowed to visit Hanlin Institute once every three to five days to continue to look over the matters of state. Meanwhile, the eunuchs, believing that Wang Shuwen was intending them harm by giving Fan the command, instructed the Shence Army officers not to yield to Fan's orders. When Fan reached the frontier, none of the Shence Army officers came to greet him, and he was forced to return to the capital Chang'an. When Han Tai reported this to Wang Shuwen, Wang Shuwen became distressed but was unable to think of anything further to do.

Around this time, also, Wei and Wang Shuwen began to break with each other, as Wei wanted not to be seen as a puppet of Wang Shuwen's. For example, when Yang Shi'e (羊士諤), a messenger from Xuanshe Circuit (宣歙, headquartered in modern Xuancheng, Anhui), and Liu Pi, a messenger from Xichuan Circuit (西川, headquartered in modern Chengdu, Sichuan), made demands on behalf of their superiors, Wang angrily wanted to execute both of them, but Wei opposed, and Yang was only exiled, while Liu Pi fled back to Xichuan. This incident created a substantial rift between Wang Shuwen and Wei. After Liu Pi returned to Xichuan, his commanding officer, the military governor of Xichuan Circuit, Wei Gao, further submitted a harshly worded accusation against Wang Shuwen and his associates. Wei Gao's words were soon echoed in petitions submitted by other regional governors Pei Jun (裴均) and Yan Shou (嚴綬), and it was said that Wang Shuwen and his associates were greatly distressed.

Meanwhile, Wang Shuwen's mother had become seriously ill to the point of near death. Wang Shuwen, anticipating that he would have to leave governmental service to observe a period of mourning for her, held a banquet and invited the other imperial scholars, as well as Li Zhongyan, Ju, and another powerful eunuch Liu Guangqi (劉光奇), to try to defend his actions with these eunuchs, including his attempts to have Yang and Liu Pi executed and his attempts to reform the economic regulations. Ju was thoroughly dismissive, and it was said that as Wang Shuwen made each point, Ju would rebut each point. On July 19, when his mother died, Wang Shuwen left governmental service.

It was said that after Wang Shuwen left governmental service, Wei Zhiyi further abandoned the alliance, drawing Wang Shuwen's anger and causing him and his associates to plan to have Wang Shuwen recalled to government to counteract Wei. Wang Pi submitted petitions to have Wang Shuwen recalled to governmental service and be made a chancellor, but none of Wang Pi's petitions were acted on. Wang Pi, seeing that the situation was hopeless, feigned a stroke himself and resigned. After this, Wang Shuwen's and Wang Pi's associates began to be purged from government. Li Chun was soon made regent, and on August 31, Emperor Shunzong yielded the throne to Li Chun (as Emperor Xianzong).

== Death ==
Almost immediately after Emperor Xianzong took power — indeed, even before he was ceremonially enthroned — Wang Pi and Wang Shuwen were both exiled — in Wang Shuwen's case, to become the census officer at Yu Prefecture (渝州, in modern Chongqing). In 806, Emperor Xianzong ordered Wang Shuwen to commit suicide.

== Historical views of Wang Shuwen ==
The official histories of Tang Dynasty, the Old Book of Tang and the New Book of Tang, both charactered Wang Shuwen as conniving, power-hungry, and insolent. These characterizations were adopted by the Zizhi Tongjian. The only positive characteristic that they attributed to Wang Shuwen was a sense of duty and a desire to improve the imperial government structure.

However, as observed by such historians as the Qing Dynasty historian Wang Mingsheng (王鳴盛), Wang Shuwen was trying to reform the imperial government in such a way as to strip power from powerful eunuchs and warlords and restore it to the emperor. Wang Mingsheng pointed out that there were a number of positive reforms carried out during Emperor Shunzong's brief reign that historians did not attribute to Wang Shuwen but which could only have been the result of Wang Shuwen's actions, including:

- Exiling of the mayor of the capital municipality Jingzhao (京兆), Li Shi (李實), known for his harsh treatment of the people.
- General pardoning of past taxes owed by the people.
- Forbidding of improper tributes to the emperor.
- Releasing of ladies in waiting from palace service.
- Recalling and posthumous honoring of several key officials who had been unduly exiled during Emperor Dezong's reign.
- Commissioning of Fan Xichao in an attempt to take back control of Shence Army.

Wang Mingsheng compared Wang Shuwen to an overly aggressive daughter-in-law who tried to correct her mother-in-law in important matters as soon as she was married — in other words, being attentive but being overly eager on his agenda, and believed that Wang Shuwen had committed no crimes.

== Notes and references ==
- Old Book of Tang, vol. 135.
- New Book of Tang, vol. 168.
- Zizhi Tongjian, vol. 236.
