= Consort Niu =

Consort Niu, imperial consort rank Zhaorong (牛昭容, personal name unknown) was an imperial consort of the Chinese dynasty Tang dynasty. She was a concubine to Emperor Shunzong (Li Song).

Nothing is known about Consort Niu's background, as there is no biography of her in the collections of empresses' and imperial consorts' biographies of the Old Book of Tang or the New Book of Tang. It is not known when she became Li Song's concubine, but it appeared to be during the time that he was serving as crown prince under his father Emperor Dezong.

In 805, after Emperor Dezong's death, Li Song became emperor (as Emperor Shunzong). Li Song had, in late 804, suffered a debilitating stroke that rendered him partially paralyzed and unable to speak. It was said that, as a result, after he became emperor, he rarely met the officials and was often in the palace behind a screen, attended to by Consort Niu and the eunuch Li Zhongyan (李忠言). By this point, Consort Niu was carrying the title of Zhaorong, the sixth highest rank for imperial consorts.

It was said that Consort Niu and Li Zhongyan formed a group of decision-makers, along with Emperor Shunzong's trusted officials Wang Shuwen and Wang Pi and the chancellor Wei Zhiyi, and they effectively made the decisions on Emperor Shunzong's behalf. They feared Emperor Shunzong's oldest son Li Chun the Prince of Guangling, purportedly because of Li Chun's decisiveness, and initially resisted the suggestions by a number of officials that Li Chun be created crown prince. By written proposal of the imperial scholar Zheng Yin, however, Li Chun was created crown prince anyway. Late in 805, by which time Wang Shuwen and Wang Pi had lost power, Emperor Shunzong yielded the throne to Li Chun (as Emperor Xianzong) and took the title of Taishang Huang (retired emperor). He died in 806. Nothing further was recorded in history about Consort Niu, and it is not known whether she suffered any reprisals or when she died.

== Notes and references ==
- Zizhi Tongjian, vol. 236.
