= Gao Ying =

Tang Chinese politician

Gao Ying (高郢) (740 – July 24, 811), courtesy name Gongchu (公楚), was a Chinese politician during the Tang dynasty, who served as a chancellor during the reigns of Emperor Dezong and Emperor Shunzong.

== Background ==
Gao Ying was born in 740, during the reign of Emperor Xuanzong. His ancestors were originally from Bohai (渤海, in modern Cangzhou, Hebei), but later moved to the later Wei Prefecture (衛州, in modern Puyang, Henan), and claimed common ancestry with but not descendant from the imperial house of Northern Qi. His grandfather Gao Zhi (高質) served as a prefectural secretary general.

Gao Ying himself was said to understand the Spring and Autumn Annals at age eight and already capable of writing, such that he was praised by the Confucian scholars. When the Anshi Rebellion erupted, and the rebel Yan forces captured the capital Chang'an, Gao Ying's father Gao Boxiang (高伯祥) was serving as the sheriff of nearby Haozhi County (好畤, in modern Xianyang, Shaanxi) and tried to resist, but was captured by Yan forces. He was set to be executed, but the young Gao Ying spread his legs and loosened his clothes, offering to be executed in his father's stead. The Yan officers praised him for his filial piety and released them both.

== Early career ==
Gao Ying later passed the imperial examinations and was selected in the special class of those with great talents or unusual deeds. He was made the sheriff of Huayin County (華陰, in modern Weinan, Shaanxi). In 767, when Emperor Xuanzong's grandson Emperor Daizong, who was then emperor, was building a large Buddhist temple—Zhangjing Temple (章敬寺)—in honor of his mother Lady Wu, Gao changed into white clothes (to show fear) and submitted petitions against the waste of money in building the temple, but Emperor Daizong did not heed his advice.

Later, while the general Guo Ziyi was serving as the military governor (jiedushi) of Shuofang Circuit (朔方, headquartered in modern Yinchuan, Ningxia), he invited Gao to serve on his staff as a scribe. In 778, Guo was angry with his deputy Zhang Tan (張曇), believing that Zhang disrespected him because he rose from the soldier ranks. Guo's associate Wu Yao (吳曜) thereafter made false accusations against Zhang, and Guo executed Zhang under the pretense that Zhang was encouraging soldiers to disobey orders—over Gao's objection. Guo thus demoted Gao to be the secretary general of Yishi County (猗氏, in modern Yuncheng, Shanxi). (It was said, however, that when other staff members subsequently began to resign, Guo regretted both killing Zhang and demoting Gao.)

== During Emperor Dezong's reign ==
After the general Li Huaiguang became the military governor of Binning Circuit (邠寧, headquartered in modern Xianyang) in 779, during the reign of Emperor Daizong's son Emperor Dezong, he invited Gao Ying to serve as a secretary, and Gao was eventually promoted to be his assistant. When Li rebelled against Emperor Dezong (who was then also battling a rebellion by Zhu Ci and who had been forced to flee to Liang Prefecture (梁州, in modern Hanzhong, Shaanxi) in response to Li's rebellion) in 784, Gao tried to get him to change his mind and again submit to Emperor Dezong, but Li refused. When Li gathered his troops at his base Hezhong (河中, in modern Yuncheng) and prepared to again attack west against the Tang general Hun Jian, Gao and fellow staff member Li Yong spoke against it, and Gao further persuaded Li Huaiguang's son Li Wei (李琟) as well, and while Li Wei was fearful of the consequences of acting against imperial forces, he was also unable to persuade Li Huaiguang. Later in 784, after Zhu was destroyed by another imperial general, Li Sheng, Gao was able to get Li Huaiguang to agree to resubmit to Emperor Dezong. However, when Emperor Dezong's emissary Kong Chaofu (孔巢父) arrived at Hezhong, he angered Li Huaiguang and his soldiers by not immediately offering the command back to Li Huaiguang, and the soldiers, with Li Huaiguang's tacit approval, killed Kong and the eunuch Dan Shouying (啖守盈). Li Huaiguang thereafter continued to stand against imperial forces. In 785, when Gao's colleague Lü Mingyue (呂鳴岳) secretly submitted to imperial forces and was discovered by Li Huaiguang, Li Huaiguang killed Lü and his family and arrested Gao and Li Yong when they revealed that, they, too, had been in communication with imperial forces, but as Li Huaiguang was unwilling to execute them as well, he kept them imprisoned. After Li Huaiguang, after defeats at the hands of the imperial general Ma Sui, committed suicide later in 785, Ma invited Gao and Li Yong to serve on his own staff.

Not long after that, Gao was recalled to Chang'an to serve as Zhuke Yuanwailang (主客員外郎), a low-level official at the ministry of rites (禮部, Libu). He later successively served as Xingbu Langzhong (刑部郎中), a supervisorial official at the ministry of justice (刑部, Xingbu), and then Zhongshu Sheren (中書舍人), a mid-level official at the legislative bureau of government (中書省, Zhongshu Sheng), where he served for nine years. He was then made deputy minister of rites (禮部侍郎, Libu Shilang), and he was put in charge of the imperial examinations. It was said that at that time, the examinees often neglected their studies and spent their time on feasting and associating with officials to receive preferential treatment. Gao had long despised this trend, and after he became in charge of the imperial examinations, he refused the other officials' intercessions on part of the examinees, and it was said that within three years of Gao's becoming in charge of the examinations, the habits of the examinees had changed for the better. Gao later served as the minister of worship (太常卿, Taichang Qing). Around the new year 804, Gao was made Zhongshu Shilang (中書侍郎), the deputy head of the legislative bureau, and given the designation Tong Zhongshu Menxia Pingzhangshi (同中書門下平章事), making him a chancellor, along with Zheng Xunyu. He was also given the honorific title Yinqing Guanglu Daifu (銀青光祿大夫).

== During Emperor Shunzong's and Emperor Xianzong's reigns ==
After Emperor Dezong died in 805 and was succeeded by his severely ill son Emperor Shunzong, Gao was made the minister of justice (刑部尚書, Xingbu Shangshu) and continued to serve as chancellor. When, later in the year, Emperor Shunzong passed the throne to his son Emperor Xianzong, Gao was removed from his chancellor post but continued to serve as the minister of justice and acting minister of civil service affairs (吏部尚書, Libu Shangshu). In 806, he was made the prefect of Hua Prefecture (華州, in modern Weinan).

Later in 806, Gao was recalled to Chang'an to again serve as minister of worship, and soon he was made the chief imperial censor (御史大夫, Yushi Daifu). Several months later, he was made the minister of defense (兵部尚書, Bingbu Shangshu). Just after a month, he requested retirement, and Emperor Xianzong agreed, giving him the title of You Puye (右僕射), one of the heads of the executive bureau (尚書省, Shangshu Sheng) before approving the retirement. Gao died in 811 and was give posthumous honors and the posthumous name Zhen (貞, meaning "clean").

== Notes and references ==
- Old Book of Tang, vol. 147.
- New Book of Tang, vol. 165.
- Zizhi Tongjian, vols. 224, 225, 231, 232, 236.
