= Emperor Shunzong of Tang =

Emperor of Tang China in 805

Emperor Shunzong of Tang 唐順宗

Emperor of the Tang dynasty
- Reign: February 28 – August 28, 805
- Predecessor: Emperor Dezong
- Successor: Emperor Xianzong
- Born: Feb to Mar 761
- Died: February 11, 806 (aged 44-45)
- Burial: Feng Mausoleum (豐陵)
- Consorts: Lady Xiao of Lanling (died 790); Empress Zhuangxian (m. 775–806)
- Issue: Emperor Xianzong; Li Jing; Li Wei; Li Zong; Li Shu; Li Chou; Li Zong; Li Yue; Li Jie; Li Xiang; Li Qiu; Li Qi; Li Xuan; Li Ji; Li Xun; Li Wan; Li Shan; Li Hong; Li Gun; Li Shen; Li Lun; Li Chuo; Li Ji; Princess Hanyang; Princess Lianggongjing; Princess Dongyang; Princess Xihe; Princess Yun'an; Princess Xiangyang; Princess Guo; Princess Puyang; Princess Wen'an; Princess Xunyang; Princess Ping'en; Princess Shaoyang
Full name
- Family name: Lǐ (李); Given name: Sòng (誦)
Era name and dates
- Yǒngzhēn (永貞): September 1, 805 – January 25, 806
Posthumous name
- Emperor Zhide Dasheng Da'an Xiao (至德大聖大安孝皇帝)
Temple name
- Shùnzōng (順宗)
- House: Li
- Dynasty: Tang
- Father: Emperor Dezong
- Mother: Empress Zhaode

Tang Shunzong
- Chinese: 唐順宗
- Literal meaning: "Favorable Ancestor of the Tang"
Transcriptions
Standard Mandarin
- Hanyu Pinyin: Táng Shùnzōng

Li Song
- Chinese: 李誦
- Literal meaning: (personal name)
Transcriptions
Standard Mandarin
- Hanyu Pinyin: Lǐ Sòng

Emperor Shunzong of Tang (February to March 761 – February 11, 806), personal name Li Song, was the 13th emperor of the Chinese Tang dynasty. He was created crown prince in 779 and became emperor in 805 after the death of his father Emperor Dezong, of whom he was the oldest son. His reign lasted less than a year, as, due to his illness, the powerful eunuchs were able to get him to approve a transfer of the throne to his son Li Chun (Emperor Xianzong). Emperor Shunzong was honored with the title of Taishang Huang (retired emperor). He died in 806, with some later historians suspecting that he was murdered by the eunuchs who arranged for Emperor Xianzong's succession.

During his short reign, Emperor Shunzong and his close associates Wang Shuwen and Wang Pi employed individuals such as Liu Zongyuan, Liu Yuxi, Han Ye (韓瞱), and Han Tai (韓泰), in trying to reform and rejuvenate the administration. His reforms, intended to strengthen imperial power over regional warlords and eunuchs, were later known as the Yongzhen Reformation (永貞革新), named after his era name of Yongzhen. While Emperor Shunzong's associates lost power after his yielding of the throne, Emperor Xianzong's subsequent reign was known for its reassertion of imperial power.

== Background ==
Li Song was born in 761, during the reign of his great-grandfather Emperor Suzong, at the Eastern Palace (i.e., the palace of his grandfather Li Yu, then Crown Prince) at the Tang dynasty capital Chang'an. His father Li Kuo was Li Yu's oldest son, and he himself was Li Kuo's oldest son. His mother was Li Kuo's consort Lady Wang (who was later empress). Early in his life, he was created the Prince of Xuancheng. In 779, after the death of Li Yu (who was then emperor, as Emperor Daizong) and Li Kuo's ascension (as Emperor Dezong), Li Song was created the Prince of Xuan. In 780, he was created Crown Prince.

== As crown prince ==
Li Song was described to be kind and lenient. He favored the study of arts, and was particularly good at calligraphy. He was also respectful to his teachers and often bowed to them despite his crown prince status. In 781, he married Lady Xiao, the daughter of his grandaunt Princess Gao and her husband Xiao Sheng (蕭升), as his wife and crown princess.

In 783, when a mutiny by soldiers from Jingyuan Circuit (涇原, headquartered in Pingliang, Gansu) forced Emperor Dezong to abandon Chang'an and flee to Fengtian (奉天, in modern Xianyang, Shaanxi), Li Song accompanied Emperor Dezong to Fengtian, and was said to have personally protected Emperor Dezong during the journey to Fengtian, along with his younger brother Li Yi (李誼) the Prince of Pu. After the Jingyuan soldiers supported the general Zhu Ci as their emperor (of a new state of Qin), Zhu put Fengtian under siege, and Li Song was said to have personally participated in the defense of Fengtian, including personally encouraging soldiers and attending to the wounded.

After the rebellion was put down and Emperor Dezong and his family returned to Chang'an, Li Song's position was endangered over an incident involving his grandaunt/mother-in-law Princess Gao. As of 787, the chancellor Zhang Yanshang had discovered that the imperial guard officer Li Sheng (李昇) was secretly visiting Princess Gao, and he came to suspect that Li Sheng, whose father Li Shuming (李叔明) was a political enemy of Zhang's, was having an affair with Princess Gao. Initially, at the advice of another chancellor, Li Mi—who feared that an investigation would taint Li Song—Emperor Dezong took no actions against anyone other than to transfer Li Sheng out of the imperial guards to avoid contact with Princess Gao. However, by fall 787, the incident had flared up in public, as accusations were made that Princess Gao, who often visited Li Song's palace, was having affairs not only with Li Sheng, but also with other officials Xiao Ding (蕭鼎), Li Wan (李萬), and Wei Ke (韋恪); worse, she was also accused of secretly using witchcraft to curse Emperor Dezong. Emperor Dezong, in anger, imprisoned Princess Gao and became angry at Li Song. Li Song, fearing the taint, divorced Crown Princess Xiao, but Emperor Dezong's anger did not recede, and he considered replacing Li Song as crown prince with Li Yi. At Li Mi's earnest opposition, Emperor Dezong ultimately decided not to do so. The former crown princess was later killed on Emperor Dezong's orders, during a time when Li Song was ill.

In 795, after the former chancellor Lu Zhi and several of his associates was exiled due to false accusations by Emperor Dezong's favorite Pei Yanling, the imperial scholar Yang Cheng (陽城) led a group of junior officials in petitioning Emperor Dezong in protesting Lu's innocence, drawing Emperor Dezong's anger toward them. Emperor Dezong were initially set to punish Yang and the other junior officials, but after Li Song spoke on their behalf, Emperor Dezong did not do so. It was also said that it was Li Song's urging that Pei and another favorite of Emperor Dezong's, Wei Qumou (韋渠牟), who were poorly regarded by the people, were not made chancellors.

By 803, Li Song had become close to two of his staff members—Wang Pi, who was also a talented calligrapher, and Wang Shuwen, who was good at playing Go. It was said at that Wang Shuwen's suggestion, Li Song avoided drawing further suspicion from Emperor Dezong. (Li Song was set to speak to Emperor Dezong against Emperor Dezong's unpopular the Emperor's purchasing (宮市)—where palace eunuchs were effectively requisitioning supplies from merchants while paying no or very little compensation, and Wang Shuwen pointed out that this would cause Emperor Dezong to suspect Li Song of trying to be popular at his expense.) At Wang Shuwen's suggestion, Li Song also began to gather a group of junior officials that Wang Shuwen had befriended and considered capable of being important officials and generals in the future, including Wei Zhiyi, Lu Chun (陸淳), Lü Wen (呂溫), Li Jingjian (李景儉), Han Ye (韓曄), Han Tai (韓泰), Chen Jian (陳諫), Liu Zongyuan, Liu Yuxi, Ling Zhun (凌準), and Cheng Yi, in anticipation of his future reign.

In winter 804, Li Song had a stroke that left him partially paralyzed and unable to speak. When subsequently, Emperor Dezong became ill as well, members of the imperial family attended to him, but Li Song was unable to do so. This saddened Emperor Dezong greatly and caused his own conditions to grow worse, and he died on February 25, 805. Initially, the palace eunuchs expressed the opinion that perhaps Li Song should not succeed to the throne, but after the imperial scholar Wei Cigong (衛次公) spoke firmly in Li Song's favor, and Li Song, despite his illness, appeared to show that he was not completely incapacitated, he was able to succeed to the throne (as Emperor Shunzong).

== Reign ==
In his illness, Emperor Shunzong was unable to actually rule on everything submitted to him. He was attended to by the eunuch Li Zhongyan (李忠言) and his concubine Consort Niu, and it was said that the petitions submitted to him were ruled by him behind a screen. Li Zhongyan, Consort Niu, Wang Shuwen, Wang Pi, and the imperial scholar Wei Zhiyi (who was made a chancellor at Wang Shuwen's recommendation) formed a group who made decisions, with Wang Shuwen making rulings, giving them to Wang Pi to deliver to Li Zhongyan, and then Li Zhongyan issuing edicts in Emperor Shunzong's name approving Wang Shuwen's rulings, for Wei to execute. It was said that Wang Shuwen and his associates, including Han Tai, Liu Zongyuan, and Liu Yuxi were making decisions on personnel matters quickly, depending on their likes and dislikes.

Under this system, Emperor Shunzong quickly issued a number of orders that were intended to reform certain improper or unpopular measures of Emperor Dezong's reign:

- A general amnesty of taxes previously owed was declared.
- The "Palace Market" was abolished.
- The "Five Block Boys" (五坊小兒, imperial servants who had become arrogant over the people) were abolished.
- The institutions of tributes from regional governors and the central government's salt and iron monopoly bureau were abolished.
- A number of officials who had good reputation who were exiled by Emperor Dezong, including Lu Zhi, Zheng Yuqing, Han Gao (韓皋), and Yang Cheng, were recalled (although Lu and Yang died before they could be recalled and were later instead posthumously honored).

Wang Shuwen and his associates, however, drew resentment from other officials for their hold on power. They were particularly despised by several eunuchs who were powerful during Emperor Dezong's reign—Ju Wenzhen (俱文珍), Liu Guangqi (劉光琦), and Xue Yingzhen (薛盈珍). At the instigations of those eunuchs, the imperial scholars Zheng Yin, Wei Cigong, Wang Ya, and Li Cheng were summoned to the palace for the purpose of drafting an edict to create Emperor Shunzong's oldest son Li Chun—who was described to be intelligent and decisive and who was feared by Wang Shuwen's group, particularly Consort Niu—crown prince. Zheng Yin wrote down, "The Crown Prince should be the oldest son" and showed it to Emperor Shunzong, who nodded. On April 26, 805, the edict was promulgated, and Li Chun was officially installed as crown prince.

Meanwhile, Wang Shuwen tried to seize the control of the Shence Army from the powerful eunuchs by putting the senior general Fan Xichao (范希朝) in command of the Shence Army units on the western border, with Han Tai as Fan's deputy. However, the eunuchs realized this and ordered the Shence Army soldiers not to obey Fan's orders; when Fan arrived at his command, the officers would not even welcome him, and he and Han Tai were forced to return to Chang'an. The eunuchs also reacted by having Wang Shuwen technically promoted—to be the deputy minister of census—but stripped of his status as imperial scholar (which both he and Wang Pi had been made) to make it difficult for him to handle the affairs of state. Wang Shuwen also offended the regional warlords by trying to execute Yang Shi'e (羊士諤) and Liu Pi, two subordinate officials sent to Chang'an to make demands on the central government on behalf of their superiors (the executions were not carried out due to Wei Zhiyi's opposition). Liu Pi's superior Wei Gao, the military governor (Jiedushi) of Xichuan Circuit (西川, headquartered in modern Chengdu, Sichuan), subsequently submitted a harshly worded petition accusing Wang Shuwen and his associates of crimes, and also wrote a letter to Li Chun urging him to take over as regent. Wei Gao's petition was subsequently echoed by other military governors Pei Jun (裴均) and Yan Shou (嚴綬), causing much alarm for Wang Shuwen and his associates.

On July 19, Wang Shuwen was forced to leave governmental service when his mother died, to observe a period of mourning for her. Wang Pi made repeated attempts to have Wang Shuwen recalled to serve as chancellor, but his repeated petitions were unheeded. Realizing that their party was near defeat, Wang Pi himself claimed to have had a stroke and left governmental service as well. Thereafter, Wang Shuwen's and Wang Pi's other associates began to fall out of power. On August 26, Emperor Shunzong issued an edict making Li Chun regent, and on August 31, he issued another edict yielding the throne to Li Chun (as Emperor Xianzong). Emperor Shunzong himself took the title of Taishang Huang (retired emperor) while giving Li Chun's mother Consort Wang the title of Taishang Huanghou (太上皇后, "retired empress").

== As retired emperor ==
In winter 805, the hermit Luo Lingze (羅令則) went from Chang'an to Purun (普潤, in modern Baoji, Shaanxi) and stated to Liu Yong (劉澭) the prefect of Qin Prefecture (秦州, which had its seat at Purun) that he had an edict from Emperor Shunzong ordering Liu to start a rebellion to depose Emperor Xianzong and support a new emperor. Liu arrested Luo and delivered him to Chang'an, where Luo and his associates were caned to death. There is no record in history suggesting that Emperor Shunzong approved or knew of Luo's actions. He died on February 11, 806.

The Old Book of Tang included a commentary by Han Yu about Emperor Shunzong:

When Emperor Shunzong was the Crown Prince, he was attentive to the arts and skillful at calligraphy. Emperor Dezong was capable in writing poems, and whenever he wrote poems to the officials or military governors, he would have Emperor Shunzong calligraph them. He was lenient and kind, but decisive. He was also honoring of his teachers, and he often bowed to them. When he accompanied Emperor Dezong to Fengtian and they were pressed by the bandit Zhu Ci, he put himself before the soldiers and got up on the walls to battle and encourage the soldiers, such that they all fought earnestly. After Emperor Dezong had been emperor for a long time and no longer trusted chancellors, such favorites as Pei Yanling, Li Qiyun [(李齊運)], and Wei Qumou stole power, forcing out the likes of Lu Zhi and Zhang Pang [(張滂)]. No one else dared to speak about this, but the Crown Prince comfortably discussed and reasoned about these matters, such that Emperor Dezong never made Pei or Wei chancellor. When he once attended an imperial feast at Yuzao Palace [(魚藻宮)], there was much display of water, boats, and music on the boats, causing Emperor Dezong much happiness. The Crown Prince, however, quoted a poem that encouraged happiness but not frivolity. Whenever he reported to the emperor, he never endeared himself to eunuchs. He was Crown Prince for 20 years, and all under the heaven received his secret grace. Unfortunately, he became seriously ill when he was emperor, and his close associates took undue power. But he was able to pass the throne to the oldest and the best, such that the dynasty was able to continue in prosperity. Was he not good?

== Chancellors during reign ==
- Du You (805)
- Jia Dan (805)
- Gao Ying (805)
- Zheng Xunyu (805)
- Wei Zhiyi (805)
- Du Huangchang (805)
- Yuan Zi (805)

== Family ==
- Crown Princess Hui, of the Xiao clan of Lanling (惠皇太子妃 蘭陵蕭氏/惠皇太子妃 兰陵萧氏; d. 790), first cousin once removed
- Empress Zhuangxian, of the Wang clan of Langya (莊憲皇后 瑯琊王氏/庄宪皇后 瑯琊王氏; 763–816)
  - Li Chun, Xianzong (憲宗 李純/宪宗 李纯; 778–820), first son
  - Princess Hanyang (漢陽公主/汉阳公主; d. 840), personal name Chang (暢/畅), first daughter
    - Married Guo Cong of Huayin, Duke Taiyuan (華陰 郭𫓩/花阴 郭𫓩; d. 822)
  - Princess Lianggongjing (梁恭靖公主; d. 850), personal name Zixu (自虛/自虚), second daughter
    - Married Zheng He of Xingyang (滎陽 鄭何/荥阳 郑何; 780–824)
  - Li Wan, Prince of Fu (福王 李綰/李绾; d. 861), 15th son
  - Princess Yun'an (雲安公主/云安)
    - Married Liu Shijing (劉士涇/刘士泾)
- Virtuous Consort, of the Dong clan (德妃 董氏)
- Lady of Bright Deportment, of the Wang clan (昭儀 王氏/昭仪)
  - Li Jing, Prince of Tan (郯王 李經/李经; d. 834), second son
- Lady of Bright Deportment, of the Wang clan (昭儀 王氏/昭仪)
  - Li Zong, Prince of Huan (郇王 李綜/李综; d. 808), seventh son
  - Li Yue, Prince of Shao (邵王 李約/李约; d. 806), eighth son
  - Li Gun, Prince of Yue (岳王 李緄/李绲; d. 828), 18th son
- Lady of Bright Deportment, of the Zhao clan (昭儀 趙氏/昭仪 赵氏)
  - Li Jie, Prince of Song (宋王 李結/李结; d. 822), ninth son
- Lady of Bright Deportment, of the Cui clan (昭儀 崔氏/昭仪)
  - Princess Xunyang (潯陽公主/浔阳), 18th daughter
- Lady of Bright Countenance, of the Niu clan (昭容 牛氏)
- Lady of Clear Instruction, of the Yan clan (昭訓 閻氏/昭训 阎氏)
  - Li Xuan, Prince of Heng (衡王 李絢/李绚; d. 826), 12th son
- Lady of Clear Instruction, of the Cui clan (昭訓 崔氏/昭训)
  - Princess Linru (臨汝公主/临汝), 21st daughter
- Lady, of the Chen clan (陳氏/陈氏)
  - Princess Wen'an (文安公主; 793–828), 17th daughter
- Unknown
  - Li Wei, Prince of Jun (均王 李緯/ 李纬; d. 837), third son
  - Li Zong, Prince of Xu (漵王 李縱/溆王 李纵; d. 837), fourth son
  - Li Shu, Prince of Ju (莒王 李紓/李纾; d. 834), fifth son
  - Li Chou, Prince of Mi (密王 李綢/李绸; d. 807), sixth son
  - Li Xiang, Prince of Ji (集王 李緗/李缃; d. 823)
  - Li Qiu, Prince of Ji (冀王 李絿/李𰬗; d. 835), tenth son
  - Li Qi, Prince of He (和王 李綺/李绮; d. 833), 11th son
  - Li Ji, Prince of Qin (欽王 李績/钦王 李绩), 13th son
  - Li Xun, Prince of Hui (會王 李/会王; d. 810), 14th son
  - Li Shan, Prince of Zhen (珍王 李繕/李缮), 16th son
  - Li Hong, Prince of Fu (撫王 李紘/抚王 李纮; d. 876), 17th son
  - Li Shen, Prince of Yuan (袁王 李紳/李绅; d. 860), 19th son
  - Li Lun, Prince of Gui (桂王 李綸/李纶; d. 814), 20th son
  - Li Chuo, Prince of Yi (翼王 李綽/李绰; d. 862), 21st son
  - Li Ji, Prince of Qi (蘄王 李緝/蕲王 李缉; d. 867), 22nd son
  - Princess Dongyang (東陽公主 / 东阳)
    - Married Cui Qi of Boling (博陵 崔杞/)
  - Princess Xihe (西河公主)
    - Married Shen Hui of Wuxing (吳興 沈翬/吴兴 沈翚), and had issue (one son)
    - Married Guo Xian of Huayin (華陰 郭銛/花阴 郭铦; 786–822)
  - Princess Xiangyang (襄陽公主/襄阳)
    - Married Zhang Keli (張克禮/张克礼), and had issue (one son)
  - Princess Guo (虢公主)
    - Married Wang Chengxi (王承系), the third son of Wang Shizhen, in 805
  - Princess Puyang (濮陽公主/濮阳)
  - Princess Ping'en (平恩公主), 22nd daughter
  - Princess Shaoyang (邵陽公主/邵阳), 23rd daughter

== See also ==
- Chinese emperors family tree (middle)

Regnal titles
Preceded by Emperor Dezong of Tang	Emperor of the Tang dynasty 805	Succeeded by Emperor Xianzong of Tang
