= Du You =

Chancellor of Tang Dynasty and historian (735–812)

Du You (Chinese: 杜佑; pinyin: Dù Yòu; Wade–Giles: Tu Yu) (735 – December 23, 812), courtesy name Junqing (君卿), formally Duke Anjian of Qi (岐安簡公), was a Chinese historian, military general, and politician. He served as chancellor of the Tang dynasty. Du was born to an eminent aristocratic family in what is now Xi'an, Shaanxi, almost eighteen years before the abrupt rebellion of An Lushan, and received office for the privilege as administrator of Chi-nan commandery (modernly Licheng District). Robert G. Hoyland considers him a "political thinker on a grand scale," comparable to Ibn Khaldun, but he is most often remembered for his thirty-six year compilation of the Tongdian, a historical encyclopedia of 200 sections (volumes) collecting laws, regulations, and general events from ancient times to his own.

While considering Confucian teachings on the relationship between father and son essential, Du stated that he didn't believe that they provided relevant information for government policy. A legal specialist and authority over state finances, he became Commissioner for Public Revenue and Salt and Iron, and has been called a "Legalist" for his appreciation of political planners, dismissal of antiquity and concepts like fate, and strong interest in the Xunzi. John Keay calls him "enamored" of Shang Yang.

However, despite expending little effort on rectifying imperial conduct, he still believed in the possibility of moral transformation along the lines of Xun Kuang, and considered rites essential to government (which in Xun Kuang's view encompass all government regulations and institutions). Du favored the light taxation system of the Confucians and the recommendation system of the Han dynasty as a replacement for the examination system. As a character he has often been regarded as antithetical to the more Confucian Lu Zhi, but in reality they seemed to agree on a number of points and Lu didn't have any problem recommending Du for his abilities.

== Writing of the Tongdian ==
Du You had been impressed by a 35-volume work by Liu Zhi during Emperor Xuanzong's reign known as the Zhengdian, which was a compendium of philosophies, rites, and principles of governance. However, Du considered the Zhengdian to be incomplete, so he expanded on the coverage of the Zhengdian and added writings about the rites, music, and written works of Emperor Xuanzong's time, into a 200-volume work. In 801, while he was still at Huainan, he had his subordinates carry the work to Chang'an to offer it to Emperor Dezong. Emperor Dezong issued an edict greatly praising the work. The work became popular and a key source of information on rites, music, criminal law, and governance for the people of the time, and it was said that it was so detailed that the information from the last thousand years could be accessible easily.

== Background ==
Du You was born in 735, during the reign of Emperor Xuanzong. His family, the Du clan of Jingzhao, was from the Tang dynasty capital Chang'an and traced its ancestry to a line of officials of Chu, Qin dynasty, Han dynasty, Cao Wei, Jin dynasty (266–420), Northern Zhou, and Tang. Du You's great-grandfather Du Xingmin (杜行敏), grandfather Du Que (杜愨), and father Du Xiwang (杜希望) all served as officials in Tang governments.

Du You's own civil service career started from a position that he was given on account of his heritage — the military advisor to the governor of Ji'nan Commandery (濟南, in modern Jinan, Shandong). He later was made secretary general of Yan County (剡縣, in modern Shaoxing, Zhejiang). As he went through Run Prefecture (潤州, in modern Zhenjiang, Jiangsu), he went to see the prefect, Wei Yuanfu (韋元甫), who had previously been a beneficiary of Du Xiwang's, but initially, Wei, not remembering that, treated him only like the son of an old friend.

On one way during Du You's visit, however, when Wei was judging over a difficult case, Wei wanted to test Du and therefore asked him for his opinions, and his opinions were all correct ones, impressing Wei. Wei kept him as legal advisor. Later, when Wei served successively as the governor of Zhexi Circuit (浙西, headquartered in modern Zhenjiang) and military governor (Jiedushi) of Huainan Circuit (淮南, headquartered in modern Yangzhou, Jiangsu), he continued to invite Du to serve on staff and entrusted Du with many responsibilities. Later, Du was recalled to Chang'an to serve as Gongbu Langzhong (工部郎中), a supervisorial official at the ministry of public works (工部, Gongbu). Yet later he successively served as the director of the Qingmiao (青苗) tax (i.e., taxation on young food crops) for Jiangxi Circuit (江西, headquartered in modern Nanchang, Jiangxi); the prefect of Fu Prefecture (撫州, in modern Fuzhou, Jiangxi); and the director of Rong District (容管, headquartered in modern Yulin, Guangxi).

== During Emperor Dezong's reign ==
During the reign of Emperor Xuanzong's great-grandson Emperor Dezong, after Yang Yan became chancellor in 779, Yang had Du recalled to Chang'an, and Du successively served as Gongbu Langzhong again and then as Jinbu Langzhong (金部郎中), a supervisorial official at the ministry of census (戶部, Hubu). In 780, Yang also had Du made the director of food supplies from the Yangtze River and Huai River regions. He later served in another supervisorial position at the ministry of census — Duzhi Langzhong (度支郎中), before being promoted to be the deputy minister of census (戶部侍郎, Hubu Shilang), in charge of the financial matters of the state. With Emperor Dezong waging multiple campaigns against warlords ruling their circuits in de facto independent manners at the time, Du was forced to raise taxes heavily and force merchants to lend one quarter of their assets to the state to cover the expenses.

Du would become despised by Yang's successor as primary chancellor, Lu Qi, and Lu had him sent out to be the prefect of Su Prefecture (蘇州, in modern Suzhou, Jiangsu). Du declined the assignment on account that his mother was still alive and the previous prefect of Su Prefecture had to leave office when his mother died. He was then made the prefect of Rao Prefecture (饒州, in modern Shangrao, Jiangxi), and soon thereafter the military governor of Lingnan Circuit (嶺南, headquartered in modern Guangzhou, Guangdong). Up to that point, the military governor of Lingnan customarily also carried the title of director of five special districts that Lingnan was divided into — one of which was Rong District, which Du had previously governed. Because Emperor Dezong had been forced to flee Chang'an due to a rebellion by Zhu Ci in 783, however, the officials at his makeshift court did not have full knowledge about precedents, and Du became the first military governor of Lingnan not to also be director of the five districts.

In 787, Du was recalled to Chang'an to serve as Shangshu Zuo Cheng (尚書左丞), one of the secretaries general of the executive bureau of government (尚書省, Shangshu Sheng). He was later made the governor (觀察使, Guanchashi) of Shan Prefecture (陝州, in modern Sanmenxia, Henan) and then the military governor of Huainan Circuit. While he was serving there, his mother died, but Emperor Dezong recalled him from his mourning period to continue his service. In 800, after Zhang Jianfeng the military governor of neighboring Xusihao Circuit (徐泗濠, headquartered in modern Xuzhou, Jiangsu) died, the soldiers of Xusihao assassinated the acting military governor Zheng Tongcheng (鄭通誠) and supported Zhang's son Zhang Yin (張愔) as his replacement. Emperor Dezong gave Du the additional post as military governor of Xusihao, gave him the honorary chancellor designation of Tong Zhongshu Menxia Pingzhangshi (同中書門下平章事), and ordered him to attack Xusihao's capital Xu Prefecture. Du sent his officer Meng Zhun (孟準) to attack Xu Prefecture, but Meng was defeated while trying to cross the Huai River. When another attack by Zhang Pi (張伾) the prefect of Si Prefecture (泗州, in modern Huai'an, Jiangsu) also failed to capture Xu Prefecture, Emperor Dezong was forced to make Zhang Yin the military prefect (團練使, Tuanlianshi) of Xu Prefecture, but took the other two prefectures of the circuit and merged them into Huainan Circuit, under Du's command. (When one of Zhang Jianfeng's staff members, the future chancellor Li Fan, subsequently fled to Huainan's capital Yang Prefecture, one of Zhang Jianfeng's former subordinates, Du Jian (杜兼), falsely accused Li Fan of encouraging Zheng's assassination and the soldiers' support of Zhang Yin. Emperor Dezong, believing Du Jian's accusation, ordered Du You to execute Li, but at Du You's intercession, Li was spared.)

In 802, with Du You repeatedly requesting to be replaced, Emperor Dezong made Wang E (王鍔) Du's replacement and recalled him to Chang'an. After Du arrived in Chang'an in 803, he was made chancellor with the designation of Tong Zhongshu Menxia Pingzhangshi and acting Sikong (司空, one of the Three Excellencies).

== During Emperor Shunzong's and Emperor Xianzong's reigns ==
When Emperor Dezong died in 805 and was succeeded by his son Emperor Shunzong, Du You served as regent for several days before Emperor Shunzong officially took over the reins of the state. Soon thereafter, Du was again put in charge of the financial matters of the state, with Emperor Shunzong's close associate Wang Shuwen as his deputy — as Wang, who was powerful at the time, believed that it would be more appropriate to serve as deputy to the senior Du. Several months later, however, when Wang Shuwen's mother died and he had to leave official service to observe a mourning period for her, Wang's partisans lost power. Wang's ally Wang Pi made repeated requests to Du for him to intercede to recall Wang Shuwen from his mourning period, but Du was either unwilling or unable to. Soon thereafter, Emperor Shunzong, who was seriously ill, yielded the throne to his son Emperor Xianzong, and Wang Shuwen and his associates were almost immediately purged.

While Du was serving as the director of finances, he reorganized the financial matters and returned a number of responsibilities that the director of finances had undertaken to other agencies which had previously had those responsibilities. When Emperor Shunzong died in 806, Du again briefly served as regent for several days. Later in 806, Du requested that he be relieved from his financial responsibilities and recommended his deputy Li Sun (李巽, who had replaced Wang Shuwen at Du's recommendation) as his replacement. Also in 806, he was made, in addition to chancellor, Situ (司徒, also one of the Three Excellencies) and created the Duke of Qi. As Du was old at that time, Emperor Xianzong afforded him great respect, referring to him only as Situ and not by name.

When Du requested retirement due to old age in 807, Emperor Xianzong had him keep all of his offices but be allowed to go into semi-retirement at his mansion in Fanchuan (樊川, near Chang'an), only to visit the office of the chancellors two or three times a month to discuss important matters of state. Fanchuan was scenic, and Du often invited the other officials to feasts there. Around that time, Dangxiang tribesmen often served as guides for Tufan forces in attacking Tang territory, and there were many suggestions by officials to attack Dangxiang tribes. Du submitted a petition advising against attacking Dangxiang, reasoning that the better strategy is to treat Dangxiang tribes with kindness to get them to submit. Emperor Xianzong appreciated the suggestions. In 812, when Du fell ill, he again requested retirement, and this time Emperor Xianzong approved. Du died later in the year and was given great posthumous honors. His grandson Du Cong later served as a chancellor during the reigns of Emperor Wuzong and Emperor Yizong; another grandson, Du Mu, was a famed poet of the late Tang period.

It was said that Du was diligent and studious, and even when he reached the apex of governmental service, he continued to study earnestly. Whenever he discussed policies with his staff members, they were impressed by his logical reasoning and knowledge. It was said that his acts were almost without fault, except that his reputation suffered when, during his service as military governor of Huainan, his wife Lady Liang died, and he promoted a concubine, Lady Li, to be his new wife despite his family members' urging against it.

== Notes and references ==
- Old Book of Tang, vol. 147
- New Book of Tang, vol. 166.
- Zizhi Tongjian, vols. 226, 227, 235, 236, 237, 238.
