= Wang Pi =

Tang Chinese calligrapher and politician during the reign of Shunzong

Wang Pi (Chinese: 王伾; died 805?) was a Chinese calligrapher and politician of the Tang dynasty, who was a close associate of Emperor Shunzong (Li Song). He, along with his ally Wang Shuwen, was powerful during Emperor Shunzong's brief reign in 805, but soon lost power and died in exile.

== Background and service under Li Song as crown prince ==
It is not known when Wang Pi was born, but it is known that his family was from Hang Prefecture (杭州, in modern Hangzhou, Zhejiang). He was at some point made a reserve official at Hanlin Institute (翰林院), where imperial scholars gathered, and later made a member of the staff of Li Song—then crown prince under his father Emperor Dezong. It was said that he became favored by Li Song because of his abilities in calligraphy, and he became a close associate of Li Song's, having easy access to Li Song's palace and often spending time with Li Song in leisure activities. He and another close associate of Li Song's, Wang Shuwen, became friends and allies.

== During Emperor Shunzong's reign ==
In late 804, Li Song suffered a debilitating stroke that left him partially paralyzed and unable to speak. When Emperor Dezong died on February 25, 805, there were initially some eunuchs who suggested that someone else should succeed Emperor Dezong, but at the strong advocacy of the imperial scholar Wei Cigong (衛次公), Li Song's succession was not further questioned despite his illness. To show that he was still not completely incapacitated, Li Song was forced to personally show himself to the imperial guards, and he took the throne (as Emperor Shunzong).

However, Emperor Shunzong remained seriously ill, and he was often attended to only by the eunuch Li Zhongyan (李忠言) and his concubine Consort Niu. Much of the decisions on important matters of state were entrusted to Wang Pi and Wang Shuwen, both of whom were named imperial scholar and was largely making decisions at the Hanlin Institute. Under Wang Shuwen's recommendation, Wei Zhiyi was made a chancellor, and it was said that Wei, Wang Shuwen, Wang Pi, Li Zhongyan, and Consort Niu formed a group of decision makers. It was said that much authority were also delegated to Han Tai (韓泰), Liu Zongyuan, and Liu Yuxi, and that Wang Shuwen was effectively the leader. His associates were also said to be praising each other and comparing each other to such great historical figures as Yi Yin, the Duke of Zhou, Guan Zhong, and Zhuge Liang. Many officials were being promoted and demoted based on their recommendations. Wang Pi also received the office of Zuo Sanqi Changshi (左散騎常侍), a high-level consultant at the examination bureau of government (門下省, Menxia Sheng).

Traditional historical accounts painted an unflattering picture of Wang Pi—describing him as ugly in appearance, lacking ambitions in accomplishment, and speaking in Wu tongue. It was said that Wang Pi was taking a large amount of bribes, and that his house had no closets or regular chests, but a single large chest in which he stored his treasure; at night, he and his wife would sleep on it.

In summer 805, when the powerful eunuch Ju Wenzhen (俱文珍) had Wang Shuwen technically promoted—to be the deputy minister of census—but removed from the post of imperial scholar, thus disallowing him from attending to matters of state at Hanlin Institute—Wang Pi interceded with Emperor Shunzong on Wang Shuwen's behalf, and Wang Shuwen was allowed to visit Hanlin Institute once every three to five days. Soon, however, Wang Shuwen's mother died, and he was forced to leave governmental service to observe a mourning period. Left without his main ally, it was said that Wang Pi became panicked, and he made repeated petitions to have Wang Shuwen recalled to government service to be chancellor, to no avail. In fall 805, knowing that he and his allies were near defeat, Wang Pi claimed to have suffered a stroke and no longer attended to governmental matters.

== Death ==
Late in 805, Emperor Shunzong yielded the throne to his son Li Chun the Crown Prince (as Emperor Xianzong). Even before he was formally enthroned, Emperor Xianzong immediately had Wang Shuwen and Wang Pi exiled, on September 2—in Wang Pi's case, to be the military advisor to the prefect of Kai Prefecture (開州, in modern Chongqing). It was said that Wang Pi soon died in exile, and it was implied that that was later in 805.

== Notes and references ==
- Old Book of Tang, vol. 135.
- New Book of Tang, vol. 168.
- Zizhi Tongjian, vol. 236.
