= Zhang Yanshang =

Chinese chancellor

Zhang Yanshang (張延賞; 727 – September 7, 787), né Zhang Baofu (張寶符), was a Chinese politician serving as a chancellor during the reign of Emperor Dezong.

== Background ==
Zhang Baofu was born in 727, during the reign of Emperor Xuanzong. His family traced its ancestry to the Jin Dynasty official Zhang Hua. His father Zhang Jiazhen had previously been a chancellor under Emperor Xuanzong and continued to serve in prominent positions after his removal in 723. Zhang Jiazhen died in 729, however, when Zhang Baofu was only two years old. Near the end of Emperor Xuanzong's Kaiyuan era (713-741), the mayor of Jingzhao Municipality (京兆, i.e., the region of the Tang capital Chang'an), Han Chaozong (韓朝宗), who had previously been recommended by Zhang Jiazhen, stated to Emperor Xuanzong:

Your Imperial Majesty treated your chancellors with honor, when you commission them and when you remove them. Even after their deaths, their descendants are allowed to serve you. Zhang Jiazhen had a son named Zhang Baofu when he was old, and Zhang Baofu does not yet have a commission.

Emperor Xuanzong, hearing this, was saddened, and he summoned Zhang Baofu and made him an army officer. Emperor Xuanzong also gave him a new name — Yanshang, meaning "extended favor." It was said that Zhang Yanshang was well-versed in the Confucian classics and histories and he also became known for administrative talent. The official Miao Jinqing, who later served as a chancellor as well, was impressed with his talent and gave him a daughter in marriage.

== During Emperor Suzong's reign ==
During the Anshi Rebellion, Emperor Xuanzong's son and successor Emperor Suzong was, for some time, at Fengxiang (鳳翔, in modern Baoji, Shaanxi), and while there, he made Zhang Yanshang an imperial censor, initially with the rank Jiancha Yushi (監察御史), then as Dianzhong Shiyushi (殿中侍御史). Thereafter, the general Wang Sili (王思禮), who then carried the title of military governor (Jiedushi) of Guanzhong Circuit, requested to have Zhang serve as his assistant, and when Wang was later made the military governor of Hedong Circuit (河東, headquartered in modern Taiyuan, Shanxi), Zhang served as the deputy mayor of Taiyuan Municipality under Wang. He was later recalled to Chang'an to serve as a low-level official at the ministry of justice (刑部, Xingbu).

== During Emperor Daizong's reign ==
After Emperor Suzong died in 762 and was succeeded by his son Emperor Daizong, the chancellor Yuan Zai became a dominant figure at court. As Yuan had been recommended by Miao Jinqing, he treated Zhang Yanshang, as Miao's son-in-law, with kindness. When Emperor Daizong was forced to flee to Shan Prefecture (陝州, in modern Sanmenxia, Henan) in 763, at Yuan's recommendation, Emperor Daizong made Zhang an imperial attendant (給事中, Jishizhong). Soon thereafter, he became deputy chief imperial censor (御史中丞, Yushi Zhongcheng) and Zhongshu Sheren (中書舍人), a mid-level official at the legislative bureau of government (中書省, Zhongshu Sheng).

In 767, Zhang was made the mayor of Henan Municipality (河南, i.e., the region of the eastern capital Luoyang). During the Anshi Rebellion, Luoyang suffered greatly from the wars, and much of it was in ruins. It was said that Zhang was diligent and hardworking, and he ruled simply. He also reopened the canals and rebuilt the palaces and imperial temples. Within several years, refugees returned, and Luoyang returned to prosperity. Emperor Daizong thus praised him in an edict. In 770, when the office of deputy supreme commander of the Henan, Huaixi (淮西, headquartered in modern Zhumadian, Henan), and Shannan (i.e., the region south of the Qinling Mountains) Regions was abolished, the troops formerly attached to that office were transferred to Zhang. Subsequently, Zhang was recalled to Chang'an to serve as chief imperial censor (御史大夫, Yushi Daifu). While he was serving in that role, there was an occasion when the junior official Li Shaoliang (李少良) submitted a number of accusations against Yuan, and Yuan's associates, in turn, accused Li of false accusations and had him arrested and detained at the office of the imperial censors. Zhang disapproved of the action and did not want to be involved, and he was sent to Huainan Circuit (淮南, headquartered in modern Yangzhou, Jiangsu) to serve as its military governor as well as the prefect of its capital Yang Prefecture (揚州). At that time, there was a drought in the circuit, and a large number of the people were trying to depart for other regions. Zhang's subordinates detained them, but Zhang, pointing out that the people should be given the opportunity to survive the drought, allowed them to leave and, in their absence, kept their houses maintained and exempted them from taxes. As a result, many returned thereafter. He later left governmental service when his mother died, to observe a period of mourning for her. After the mourning period was over, he was recalled to serve as the military governor of Jingnan Circuit (荊南, headquartered in modern Jingzhou, Hubei), as well as the mayor of its capital, Jiangling Municipality.

== During Emperor Dezong's reign ==
Emperor Daizong died in 779 and was succeeded by his son Emperor Dezong. Later that year, Emperor Dezong made Zhang Yanshang the military governor of Xichuan Circuit (西川, headquartered in modern Chengdu, Sichuan) and the mayor of its capital Chengdu Municipality. During this time, when Xichuan was under attack by Tufan and Nanzhao forces, and imperial forces, commanded by Li Sheng and Qu Huan (曲環) were in Xichuan to aid Xichuan forces; they were ultimately able to repel Tufan and Nanzhao attacks. (At the end of the campaign, however, there was a serious dispute between Zhang and Li Sheng — Li Sheng had, after the campaign, taken the military prostitute Gao Hong (高洪) with him. Zhang, angry with this, sent messengers to chase after Li Sheng's army to demand Gao back, thus causing a grudge between Li Sheng and Zhang.) In 783, there was a mutiny by his subordinate Zhang Ku (張朏), who had been posted in the mountains in the west of Chengdu in defense against Tufan. Zhang Ku attacked Chengdu, forcing Zhang Yanshang to flee to Han Prefecture (漢州, in modern Deyang, Sichuan). It was only after another subordinate of Zhang Yanshang's, Chigan Sui (叱干遂), attacked and killed Zhang Ku, that Zhang Yanshang was able to return to Chengdu. It was said that Zhang followed the law and ruled the circuit leniently, allowing the people of the circuit to recover from the wars that had ravaged the circuit ever since Anshi Rebellion.

At that time, Emperor Dezong was faced with a rebellion by the general Zhu Ci and was forced to flee Chang'an. During the times that he was at Fengtian (奉天, in modern Xianyang, Shaanxi) and then at Liang Prefecture (梁州, in modern Hanzhong, Shaanxi), until he was able to return to Chang'an after Zhu was defeated by the general Li Sheng in fall 784, Emperor Dezong relied on supplies from Xichuan Circuit, and in summer 784, he gave Zhang the honorary chancellor designation of Tong Zhongshu Menxia Pingzhangshi (同中書門下平章事). In 785, when the chancellor Liu Congyi was seriously ill (and Liu would die later in the year), Emperor Dezong thus recalled Zhang to Chang'an, intending to make him an actual chancellor. Li Sheng, still displeased with Zhang, submitted a petition accusing Zhang of a number of crimes, and Emperor Dezong, not willing to go against Li's wishes, for the time being only made Zhang Zuo Pushe (左僕射), one of the heads of the executive bureau (尚書省, Shangshu Sheng).

By 786, however, Zhang was beginning to gain the upper hand against Li in their struggle, as Li's son-in-law Zhang Yu (張彧), displeased that Li had held a grander ceremony and given more dowry when marrying another daughter to Cui Shu (崔樞) than when marrying Zhang Yu's wife to him, became an associate of Zhang's, as did another subordinate of Li's, Zheng Yunkui (鄭雲逵). Emperor Dezong also had been suspicious of Li due to his longtime hold on the loyalty of the army, as well as various rumors fostered by Tufan agents that Li was planning treason. Li, hearing that Emperor Dezong was suspecting him, offered to resign his post as military governor of Fengxiang Circuit (鳳翔, headquartered in modern Baoji, Shaanxi), in winter 786 when he was Chang'an. Emperor Dezong declined, and instead requested the intervention of the chancellor Han Huang, who was friendly with LI. Han and the general Liu Xuanzuo (劉玄佐), the military governor of Xuanwu Circuit (宣武, headquartered in modern Kaifeng, Henan), therefore, held a feast for Zhang and Li, hoping to dissolve their enmity. Both agreed, and Li further tried to dissolve Zhang's resentment by endorsing him as chancellor. In spring 787, Emperor Dezong, accordingly, made Zhang a chancellor. However, while Zhang agreed to dissolve his resentment, the resentment persisted, and when Li requested that Zhang give a daughter to one of his sons in marriage, Zhang refused, causing Li to comment:

Military men are more straightforward. Once they release their resentment when drinking, they will no longer hold it in their chests. This is unlike civilians; even though on the outside, there is resolution of anger, but the resentment remains inside. How can I not fear this?

Later in 787, Zhang, in conflict with his chancellor colleague Qi Ying, who had already offended Emperor Dezong by his honest words, and Zhang opined to Emperor Dezong that Qi did not have the talent to be a chancellor. Emperor Dezong demoted Qi to be a prefectural prefect.

Around the same time, Han died, and both Zhang and the general Ma Sui, who also had a grudge against Li, advocated for peace for Tufan, which Li had opposed. Emperor Dezong, who personally favored an alliance with Tufan against Huige, used Li's opposition against the Tufan alliance to remove Li from his post at Fengxiang. Zhang recommended Zheng, but Emperor Dezong allowed Li to recommend his successor; Li recommended his officer Xing Junya (邢君牙). Emperor Dezong recalled Li to Chang'an to serve as Zhongshu Ling and Taiwei (太尉, one of the Three Excellencies) and relieved him of all of his military duties. It was said that once Li returned to Chang'an, despite the suspicions that he was under, he nevertheless spoke honestly whenever he had opinions about the matters of state. In light of Zhang's involvement in Li's command being lifted, subsequently, when Zhang wanted Li Baozhen the military governor of Zhaoyi Circuit (昭義, headquartered in modern Changzhi, Shanxi), and then Liu, to serve as the new commander of defense forces on the borders with Tufan, both Li Baozhen and Liu declined. Meanwhile, Zhang also drew resentment from other officials when he made major cuts into the ranks of prefectural and county officials — eliminating about 1,000 positions — hoping to use the savings in reduced salaries for military purposes, despite objections from Ma, Wei Lun (韋倫), and Bai Zhizhen (白志貞).

By summer 787, Emperor Dezong and Tufan's chancellor Shang Jiezan (尚結贊) had negotiated a peace treaty, and the general Hun Jian, as Emperor Dezong's emissary, was set to meet with Shang at Pingliangchuan (平涼川, in modern Pingliang, Gansu). Li Sheng, fearing Tufan treachery, instructed Hun to be careful, but Zhang, hearing this, accused Li Sheng of interfering with the peace with Tufan. Emperor Dezong thus instructed Hun to relax, not to aggravate Tufan in any way. On July 8, 787, at the meeting site, Shang laid a trap for Hun and launched a sudden attack, killing and capturing many of Hun's attendants, but Hun escaped. When the news reached Chang'an, Emperor Dezong was so panicked that he considered fleeing Chang'an, but remained due to Li Sheng's advice. As a result of this debacle, Zhang claimed an illness and retired, while Emperor Dezong recalled Ma to the capital and stripped him of his command. Subsequently, the reduction in officer ranks was reversed under the advice of another chancellor, Li Mi.

Meanwhile, Zhang's rivalry with another official — Li Shuming (李叔明) the military governor of Dongchuan Circuit (東川, headquartered in modern Mianyang, Sichuan) — which formed when they governed neighboring circuits, led Zhang to carry out some additional actions intended to bring down Li Shuming. At that time, Li Shuming's son Li Shēng (李昇, note different tone and character than the great general) was repeatedly seen visiting Emperor Dezong's aunt Princess Gao, whose daughter was the wife and crown princess of Emperor Dezong's son and crown prince Li Song. He informed this to Emperor Dezong, intimating that Li Shēng was having an affair with Princess Gao. When Emperor Dezong asked Li Mi to investigate this, however, Li Mi correctly guessed that it was Zhang who informed Emperor Dezong of this and suggested no investigation, pointing out that Zhang's accusations also appeared to be intended to endanger Li Song. Emperor Dezong agreed, and thereafter moved Li Shēng to the position of head of Li Song's household, away from Princess Gao.

Zhang died in winter 787 and was given posthumous honors. He was also given the posthumous name of Chengsu (成肅, meaning "successful and solemn"). His son Zhang Hongjing later served as a chancellor during the reign of Emperor Dezong's grandson Emperor Xianzong.

Ouyang Xiu, the lead editor of the New Book of Tang, commented thus about Zhang:

Zhang Yanshang served at four circuits, and wherever he went, the people praised him for his love. After he became chancellor, however, he gave in to his emotions and acted in hatred, and therefore did not meet people's expectations. He also died early, and was unable to accomplish much as chancellor.

== Notes and references ==
- Old Book of Tang, vol. 129.
- New Book of Tang, vol. 127.
- Zizhi Tongjian, vols. 224, 226, 229, 230, 232.
