= Liu Zi =

Liu Zi (劉滋; 729 – November 19, 794), courtesy name Gongmao (公茂), was an official of the Chinese Tang dynasty, briefly serving as a chancellor during the reign of Emperor Dezong.

== Background ==
Liu Zi was born in 729, during the reign of Emperor Xuanzong. His family traced its ancestry to the imperial house of the Han dynasty and a line of officials of the Jin dynasty (266–420), Northern Wei, Northern Qi, Sui dynasty, and Tang dynasty. Liu Zi's grandfather Liu Zixuan was a prominent official and historian during Emperor Xuanzong's reign, and his father Liu Kuang (劉貺) continued in the role of historian thereafter.

== Career prior to chancellorship ==
Because of his heritage, Liu Zi was made a scribe to the crown prince when he was young. He later served as the magistrate of Lianshui County (漣水, in modern Huai'an, Jiangsu). Thereafter, the deputy minister of civil service affairs, Yang Wan, recommended him as someone who can serve as an advisor to the emperor, and so he was recalled to be Zuo Bujue (左補闕), a low-level official at the examination bureau of government (門下省, Menxia Sheng). He later resigned in order to take care of his mother, then at the eastern capital Luoyang, and while there, Li Yi (李廙) the mayor of Henan Municipality (河南, i.e., the Luoyang region) commissioned him to be a civil service officer. When his mother died, he left government service to observe a period of mourning for her. After the period of mourning was over, he was recalled to the imperial government to serve as Tuntian Yuanwailang (屯田員外郎), a low-level official at the ministry of public works (工部, Gongbu). He later served as Sixun Yuanwailang (司勳員外郎), a low-level official at the ministry of civil service affairs (吏部, Lìbu), but took on the additional responsibility of selecting low level officials. It was said that he was diligent in his duties and followed the law. He was later promoted to be Sixun Langzhong (司勳郎中), the supervisor of the officials who served as Sixun Yuanwailang, and yet later became an imperial attendant (給事中, Jishizhong).

In 783, Emperor Xuanzong's great-grandson Emperor Dezong was forced to flee the capital Chang'an when soldiers from Jingyuan Circuit (涇原, headquartered in modern Pingliang, Gansu) mutinied and supported the general Zhu Ci as their leader. Emperor Dezong fled to Fengtian (奉天, in modern Xianyang, Shaanxi). Liu Zi followed him there, and served as deputy minister of worship (太常少卿, Taichang Shaoqing), in charge of ceremonies. In 784, he was made the deputy minister of civil service affairs (吏部侍郎, Libu Shilang). At that time, as the persons from the southern parts of the empire, who normally would have gone to Chang'an to stand for imperial examinations, were unable to do so due to the wars and the famine in the Chang'an region at the time, Emperor Dezong sent Liu to Hong Prefecture (洪州, in modern Nanchang, Jiangxi), to examine them there. It was said that he carried out his duties well there.

== During and after chancellorship ==
In 786, Liu Zi was made Zuo Sanqi Changshi (左散騎常侍), a high-level consultant at the examination bureau, and given the designation Tong Zhongshu Menxia Pingzhangshi (同中書門下平章事), making him a chancellor de facto, along with Qi Ying and Cui Zao. It was said that Emperor Dezong gave Cui the responsibilities because Cui was daring to speak and act, and that Liu and Qi were both thus yielding much of the responsibilities to Cui. Emperor Dezong also put the chancellors in direct command over the six ministries of the executive bureau (尚書省, Shangshu Sheng), and Liu was given the responsibilities over the ministries of civil service affair and rites (禮部, Lǐbu, notice different tone than the ministry of civil service affairs). In 787, he was removed from his chancellor position and served as Zuo Sanqi Changshi only. In 788, he was again deputy minister of civil service affairs, and in 790 he was made the minister of civil service affairs. While Dou Can was chancellor, because Dou wanted to also be minister of civil service affairs, Liu was made the minister of justice (刑部尚書, Xingbu Shangshu). Soon thereafter, Liu was indicted by imperial censor Wei Zhenbo (韋貞伯) for having been insufficiently selective when selecting officials at the ministry of civil service affairs, and he, while not demoted, was stripped of the privilege of wearing gold and purple as due an official of his rank, along with his deputy minister Du Huangchang. Despite this, Liu's biography in the Old Book of Tang stated that he was well-learned, good at commenting, frugal, hard-working, and hated wickedness, and that while selecting officials, he was careful in examining officials' qualifications. It also stated that, as a result, those who submitted false credentials were particularly fearful of him. He died in 794 and was given posthumous honors.

== Notes and references ==
- Old Book of Tang, vol. 136.
- New Book of Tang, vol. 132.
- Zizhi Tongjian, vol. 232.
