= Zhao Renben =

Zhao Renben (趙仁本) was an official of the Chinese Tang dynasty, serving as chancellor during the reign of Emperor Gaozong.

== Background ==
Zhao Renben was from Shan Prefecture (陝州, roughly modern Sanmenxia, Henan) – but from Hebei County (河北) – the part of Shan Prefecture that was north of the Yellow River (i.e., in modern Shanxi). It is not known when he was born, other than that it was during Sui dynasty. It was said that he served as a low level official ever since Yang You (r. 617–618), and that during that time as well as the subsequent Tang dynasty, he often hand-copied imperial edicts and also made records of important events, and that people were impressed that he was keeping such good record.

== During Emperor Taizong's reign ==
During the Emperor Taizong of Tang's reign (626–649), Zhao served as an imperial auditor, and on one occasion, when there was an edict for an imperial auditor to travel a long distance on official business. Zhao's colleagues, wanting to avoid this labor, all found excuses, but Zhao volunteered for the trip, noting to his superior Ma Zhou, "I eat because of the salary that the emperor gives me, and I need to be willing to die for the emperor. Even though the journey may be tiring and dangerous, I will not find an excuse." Upon his return, because he handled the matters appropriately, he was promoted to be a mid-low level official at the ministry of civil service.

== During Emperor Gaozong's reign ==
As of 667, during the reign of Emperor Taizong's son and successor Emperor Gaozong, Zhao was serving as deputy minister of civil service as well as an advisor at the examination bureau of government (東臺, Dong Tai), when he was given the designation Tong Dong Xi Tai Sanpin (同東西臺三品), making him a chancellor de facto. At that time, one of the other chancellors, Xu Jingzong, was very powerful, and he often asked for inappropriate favors from the other chancellors. Zhao refused, and in 670, when Zhao had also been given a position on the staff of Emperor Gaozong's crown prince Li Hong, he was made a secretary general of the executive bureau (中臺, Zhong Tai) and no longer a chancellor. He died while still serving in that role early in Emperor Gaozong's Xianheng era (670–674). His great-grandson Zhao Jing later served as a chancellor during the reign of Emperor Dezong.
