= Liu Hun =

Liu Hun (柳渾) (715 – February 23, 789), né Liu Zai (柳載), courtesy name Yikuang (夷曠), alternative name Weishen (惟深), formally Count Zhen of Yicheng (宜城貞伯), was a Chinese politician during the Tang dynasty, serving as a chancellor during the reign of Emperor Dezong.

== Background ==
Liu Zai was born in 715, during the reign of Emperor Xuanzong. His family was from Xiang Prefecture (襄州, in modern Xiangfan, Hubei) but claimed as their ancestral lands the Hedong region (河東, roughly modern Shanxi) and claimed the Jin dynasty (266–420) official Liu Chun (柳純) as an ancestor. Their traceable ancestry included officials of Jin dynasty, Liu Song, Southern Qi, Liang dynasty, and Tang dynasty. His grandfather Liu Shangsu (柳尚素) and father Liu Qingxiu (柳慶休) both served as county-level officials.

Liu Zai's father Liu Qingxiu died early. He was studious, but was poor as a result of his father's early death. He passed the imperial examinations early in Emperor Xuanzong's Tianbao era (742–756) and was made the sheriff of Danfu County (單父, in modern Heze, Shandong).

== During Emperor Suzong's reign ==
During the Zhide era (756–758) of Emperor Xuanzong's son Emperor Suzong, Liu Zai served as a secretary for Huangfu Shen (皇甫侁) the surveyor of Jiangxi Circuit (江西, headquartered in modern Nanchang, Jiangxi). He was then recalled to serve as Jiancha Yushi (監察御史), an imperial censor. As the imperial censors were required to be careful and formal in their behavior, and Liu was free in his spirit, Liu became unhappy and sought another position. The chancellors had regard for his talents, however, and so had him made Zuo Bujue (左補闕), a low-level official at the examination bureau of government (門下省, Menxia Sheng). He was later given the responsibility of monitoring the tax revenues from Jiangxi Circuit.

== During Emperor Daizong's reign ==
Early in the Dali era (767–779) of Emperor Suzong's son Emperor Daizong, Wei Shaoyou (魏少遊), the governor of Jiangxi Circuit, requested that Liu Zai serve as his secretary. While he was serving under Wei, there was an occasion when the abbot of a Buddhist temple dedicated to Emperor Xuanzong was drinking at night with his disciples, and in their drunkenness, the temple suffered a fire. They blamed it on the deaf servant guarding the door, however, and bribed the military officer Wei put in charge of the investigation to submit a report indicating such. Wei believed the report and was set to punish the servant, and while many people knew of the servant's innocence, no one dared to speak. Liu and his colleague Cui Youfu, however, stepped in and reported this to Wei. Wei was surprised, and after he interrogated the abbot further, the abbot confessed. Wei thanked them and stated, "Except for you two gentleman, this old man would have committed a wrong." Later, after Lu Sigong (路嗣恭) succeeded Wei, Lu made Liu the deputy commander of the circuit militia (團練副使, Tuanlian Fushi). In 778, Liu was made the prefect of Yuan Prefecture (袁州, in modern Yichun, Jiangxi).

== During Emperor Dezong's reign ==
In 779, Emperor Daizong died and was succeeded by his son Emperor Dezong. Cui Youfu became chancellor, and he recommended Liu Zai to be the examiner of Zhejiang Circuit (浙江東西道, headquartered in modern Suzhou, Jiangsu). He was later recalled to the capital Chang'an to serve as Shangshu Zuo Cheng (尚書左丞), one of the secretaries general of the executive bureau (尚書省, Shangshu Sheng).

In 783, soldiers from Jingyuan Circuit (涇原, headquartered in modern Pingliang, Gansu), then at Chang'an to await deployment, mutinied, and Emperor Dezong was forced to flee to Fengtian (奉天, in modern Xianyang, Shaanxi). Liu followed him to Fengtian. Meanwhile, the Jingyuan soldiers supported the general Zhu Ci as their leader, and Zhu soon declared himself emperor of a new state of Qin. To create suspicion within Emperor Dezong's followers, he issued an edict naming Liu and Cui Ning chancellors. Emperor Dezong, believing Cui to be complicit in Zhu's rebellion, executed Cui, but took no actions against Liu. Later, when Emperor Dezong was forced to further flee to Liang Prefecture (梁州, in modern Hanzhong, Shaanxi), Liu followed him, and was made Zuo Sanqi Changshi (左散騎常侍), a senior advisor at the examination bureau. After Zhu's state was destroyed in 784 and Emperor Dezong returned to Chang'an, Liu, stating that his name had been tainted because it had been in an edict of Zhu's, and also that the character of Zai (載) contained a radical, ge (戈), that signified the use of force while the state was to be pacified, requested permission to change his name to Hun, and permission was granted.

In 786, Liu was made the deputy minister of defense (兵部侍郎, Bingbu Shilang) and was created the Count of Yicheng. In 787, under the recommendation of the powerful chancellor Han Huang, Liu was given the designation Tong Zhongshu Menxia Pingzhangshi (同中書門下平章事), making him a chancellor de facto as well, and he was also given authority over the examination bureau. Believing Han to be overly harsh, although he was recommended by Han, he sternly rebuked Han for battering a low-level official to death, and thereafter, Han moderated his behavior somewhat. Meanwhile, he opposed Emperor Dezong's consideration of a former close associate, Bai Zhizhen (白志貞), for promotion, believing that Bai was a flatterer unfit for promotion. Emperor Dezong nevertheless promoted Bai while Liu was away ill. When Liu recovered, he offered his resignation, but Emperor Dezong turned it down.

Later in the year, Emperor Dezong, despite the opposition of the major general Li Sheng, entered into a peace treaty with Tufan's chancellor Shang Jiezan (尚結贊). On the day that another major general, Hun Jian, as Emperor Dezong's emissary, was set to formally sign the treaty with Shang at Pingliangchuan (平涼川), Emperor Dezong remarked to the officials at Chang'an that it was a fortunate time for the state. Liu stated that he believed that he was worried because he found the Tufan to be untrustworthy, and Li agreed; Emperor Dezong, angry at their continued opposition to the treaty, rebuked them both. That night, however, reports from the general Han Yougui (韓遊瓌) arrived that Tufan forces had ambushed Hun and nearly captured him. Emperor Dezong, amazed that Liu had predicted this, had an imperial messenger deliver the report to Liu. The next day, he stated to Liu, "You are but a scholar. It is amazing how you were able to predict this so accurately." Meanwhile, because Liu was willing to speak, his relationship with fellow chancellor Zhang Yanshang, whom Emperor Dezong trusted, became poor. On one occasion, Zhang sent an associate to state to Liu, "You, lord chancellor, are greatly honored for your virtues. If you are more careful with your words in the imperial halls, you can stay chancellor for a long time." Liu responded:

Please thank Lord Zhang for me. Liu Hun's head may be cut off, but the tongue cannot be stopped.

However, Liu was soon offending Emperor Dezong, as Emperor Dezong liked people who spoke elegantly and implicitly. However, Liu was straightforward and often used colloquialisms. He wanted to demote Liu to be the secretary general for an imperial prince, but at the urging of fellow chancellor Li Mi, only demoted him to be Zuo Sanqin Changshi again.

It was said that Liu was humorous, and in his association with others he was not as arrogant as high level officials usually were. Several days after his removal as chancellor, he was touring with his old friends and did not appear at all upset over his removal. At that time, former chancellors Li Mian and Lu Han commented, "When we see Lord Liu of Yicheng, we, in comparison, feel like overly constricted men." Liu died in 789.

== Notes and references ==
- Old Book of Tang, vol. 125.
- New Book of Tang, vol. 155.
- Zizhi Tongjian, vols. 228, 232, 233.
