= Dong Jin =

Dong Jin (Chinese: 董晉; 724 – March 13, 799), courtesy name Huncheng (混成), was an official and general of the Chinese Tang dynasty, serving as a chancellor during the reign of the Emperor Dezong.

== Background ==
Dong Jin was born in 724, during the reign of Emperor Xuanzong. His family was from Hezhong Municipality (河中, in modern Yuncheng, Shanxi) and claimed ancestry from the Han Dynasty scholar Dong Zhongshu. Dong Jin's great-grandfather Dong Renwan (董仁琬) served as a prefectural education official, and his father Dong Boliang (董伯良) served as a county secretary. Dong Jin passed the imperial examinations, although it is not clear when that occurred.

== During Emperor Suzong's and Daizong's reigns ==
Early in the Zhide era (756-758) of Emperor Xuanzong's son Emperor Suzong, when Emperor Suzong was at Pengyuan (彭原, in modern Qingyang, Gansu) during the Anshi Rebellion as the armies of the rebel Yan occupied the capital Chang'an, Dong Jin went to Pengyuan and submitted a petition for an audience with the emperor, Emperor Suzong made him a Xiaoshulang (校書郎), an editor at the Palace Library. Later, he was made the secretary general at the ministry of armory supplies (衛尉丞, Weiwei Cheng), and then the military advisor to the prefect of Fen Prefecture (汾州, in modern Linfen, Shanxi). Subsequently, when the prefect, Cui Yuan, was made the military governor (Jiedushi) of Huainan Circuit (淮南, headquartered in modern Yangzhou, Jiangsu), he invited Dong to serve as his secretary. Soon, though, he was recalled to Chang'an to serve as an imperial censor, first under the title Dianzhong Shiyushi (殿中侍御史) and then Shiyushi (侍御史); he later successively served as Zhuke Yuanwailang (主客員外郎), a low-level official at the ministry of rites (禮部, Lǐbu); and then Cibu Langzhong (祠部郎中), a supervisorial low-level official at the ministry of rites.

In 769, when Emperor Suzong's son Emperor Daizong created a daughter of the general Pugu Huai'en to be Princess Chonghui, to be married to the khan of Huige, the official Li Han (李涵) served as Princess Chonghui's escort. Li Han invited Dong to serve as his secretary. When they arrived at Huige headquarters, the Huige officials threatened Li Han over Tang's late payment for horses that it had purchased from Huige. Li Han did not dare to respond, but Dong responded, pointing out that Tang had been willing to absorb Huige's excess horses without demanding better quality and that Huige should be appreciative; his responses drew respect from the Huige officials. Upon the completion of the mission, he was made Sixun Langzhong (司勳郎中), a supervisorial official at the ministry of civil service affairs (吏部, Lìbu, note different tone than the ministry of rites), and then the deputy head of the archival bureau (秘書少監, Mishu Shaojian).

== During Emperor Dezong's reign ==
After Emperor Daizong died in 779 and succession of his son Emperor Dezong, Dong Jin was made the minister of worship (太常卿, Taichang Qing). Because he had a reputation for being hardworking and careful, he was subsequently made You Sanqi Changshi (右散騎常侍), a high-level consultant at the legislative bureau (中書省, Zhongshu Sheng) as well as deputy chief imperial censor (御史中丞, Yushi Zhongcheng), but acting as the chief imperial censor. Soon, he was made the prefect of Hua Prefecture (華州, in modern Weinan, Shaanxi) as well as defender of Tong Pass.

In 783, soldiers from Jingyuan Circuit (涇原, headquartered in modern Pingliang, Gansu), then at Chang'an to await deployment to the east to combat warlords, mutinied, forcing Emperor Dezong to flee to Fengtian (奉天, in modern Xianyang, Shaanxi). The Jingyuan soldiers supported the general Zhu Ci as their leader, and Zhu soon declared himself the emperor of a new state of Qin. Zhu sent his general He Wangzhi (何望之) to attack Hua Prefecture, and Dong abandoned Hua Prefecture and fled to Fengtian, although the Tang general Luo Yuanguang (駱元光) soon recaptured Hua Prefecture. When Dong arrived at Fengtian, Emperor Dezong made him the principal of the imperial university (國子祭酒, Guozi Jijiu), and soon made him a special emissary to the region north of the Yellow River. As he was returning from his mission and went through Hezhong, Hezhong had been occupied by Li Huaiguang — a major Tang general who had rebelled recently. Dong tried to persuade Li Huaiguang to rejoin the imperial cause, and it was said that due to Dong's efforts, while Li Huaiguang did not resubmit to Emperor Dezong, he also did not join Zhu in attacking Emperor Dezong. After Chang'an was recaptured from Zhu, Dong accompanied Emperor Dezong back to Chang'an and was made a general of the imperial guards, and then Shangshu Zuo Cheng (尚書左丞), one of the secretaries general of the executive bureau (尚書省, Shangshu Sheng). At that time, his colleague as secretary general, Yuan Xiu (元琇), was in charge of financial affairs, but was demoted due to false accusations by the chancellor Han Huang. Dong met with the other chancellors and tried to speak in Yuan's defense, and while he was unsuccessful in doing so, was praised by other officials for doing so. Soon thereafter, he was again made the minister of worship.

As of 789, Li Mi was in effect the only chancellor, and Li repeatedly recommended both Dong and Dou Can, believing that Dou was capable in financial matters and Dong was morally upright. Emperor Dezong initially did not agree with Li's assessment, but in 789, with Li being seriously ill, he again recommended Dou and Dong, and Emperor Dezong finally agreed. He made Dong Menxia Shilang (門下侍郎), the deputy head of the examination bureau (門下省, Menxia Sheng). He also gave both Dou and Dong the designation Tong Zhongshu Menxia Pingzhangshi (同中書門下平章事), making them chancellors de facto. Li died shortly after, and it was said that while both Dou and Dong were chancellors, Dou had greater grasp of power and put many of his associates in powerful positions. Dong was said to be careful in his behavior, and did not leak contents of his conversations with the emperor. When his sons and brothers asked about the conversations, he would respond:

To see whether a chancellor is capable, you just have to see whether the realm is peaceful or not. Whatever he tells the emperor is immaterial.

Later, Dou began to draw Emperor Dezong's displeasure due to his arrogance and partisanship. In 792, Dou asked Dong to recommend his nephew Dou Shen (竇申) to be the deputy minister of civil service affairs. Emperor Dezong, when hearing this recommendation, sternly asked Dong, "Is it not Dou Can who asked you, Lord, to make this recommendation?" Dong did not dare to hide Dou's request from Emperor Dezong, and when Emperor Dezong subsequently asked further about Dou's faults, he reported them to Emperor Dezong. Soon, Dou was exiled, and Dong, in fear, requested to resign. In 793, Dong was removed from his chancellor position and made the minister of rites (禮部尚書, Lǐbu Shangshu). He was soon made the official in charge of the eastern capital Luoyang as well as the commander of the militias of the region.

In 796, Li Wanrong (李萬榮) the military governor of Xuanwu Circuit (宣武, headquartered in modern Kaifeng, Henan) died. His son Li Nai (李迺) started a disturbance and tried to take over the circuit, but the eunuch monitor of the army, Ju Wenzhen (俱文珍) and the officer Deng Weigong (鄧惟恭) joined forces and arrested Li Nai. Emperor Dezong then named Dong the new military governor. Deng, believing that he should be allowed to take over the circuit, refused to send messengers to welcome Dong. As Dong travelled from Luoyang toward Xuanwu's capital Bian Prefecture, he went through Zheng Prefecture (鄭州, in modern Zhengzhou, Henan). The people at Zheng Prefecture feared for Dong's safety and tried to persuade him to slow down and not proceed to Bian Prefecture. Dong refused, and continued to proceed, arriving at Bian Prefecture quickly. Deng, surprised by Dong's arrival and not knowing how to react, was forced to welcome Dong. Dong therefore took his position as military governor and entrusted much of the responsibilities of governing the army to Deng. At that time, the military governors of Xuanwu were accustomed to have a large corps of guards, and Dong dismissed them as he believed them to be unnecessary.

Meanwhile, Emperor Dezong, believing Dong to be too meek in his personality, sent Lu Changyuan (陸長源) to assist him as the commander of the army. It was said that Lu was harsh and wanted to impose rules of stricter discipline. Initially, Dong agreed, but after Lu drafted the rules, he set them aside, and the army was thus comforted. Despite this, though, Deng was fearful, and he gathered a group of some 200 soldiers, planning an uprising. The plot was discovered in winter 796, and Dong arrested Deng and delivered him to Chang'an. Emperor Dezong spared Deng's life but exiled him.

Dong died in spring 799. He was given posthumous honors and given the posthumous name of Gonghui (恭惠, meaning, "respectful and benevolent").
