= Cui Zao =

Cui Zao (崔造) (737 – October 25, 787), courtesy name Xuanzai (玄宰), was a Chinese economist, military general, and politician during the Tang dynasty, serving briefly as a chancellor during the reign of Emperor Dezong. During his chancellorship, he tried to reform the taxation system, but his reforms were opposed by Han Huang and soon reversed.

== Background ==
Cui Zao was born in 737, during the reign of Emperor Xuanzong. His family was from "the second house of Boling" of the prominent Cui clan of Boling. Cui's immediate male ancestors — great-grandfather Cui Shaorui (崔紹睿), grandfather Cui Ding (崔頂), and father Cui Shengzhi (崔昇之) — however, did not reach offices any higher than county magistrate or sheriff positions. Cui Zao had at least two brothers, an elder brother named Cui Lin (崔遴), who served as a county secretary general, and a younger brother named Cui Shu (崔述), who served as a prefectural prefect.

When Cui Zao was young, he was said to be studious. During the Yongtai era (765–766) of Emperor Xuanzong's grandson Emperor Daizong, Cui lived at Shangyuan (上元, in modern Nanjing, Jiangsu), and he had three close friends, Han Hui (韓會), Lu Dongmei (盧東美), and Zhang Zhengze (張正則). The four all were not native to Shangyuan, and they often met to discuss their views on economics. They also all had ambitions to serve the emperor, and the people at the time referred to them as the Four Kui. He was later invited by Li Qiyun (李栖筠) the governor of Zhexi Circuit (浙西, headquartered in modern Zhenjiang, Jiangsu) to serve on Li's staff. Cui later served as Zuosi Yuanwailang (左司員外郎), a low-level official under one of the Secretaries General of the executive bureau of government (尚書省, Shangshu Sheng). While serving thus, he became friendly with the senior official Liu Yan.

== During Emperor Dezong's reign ==
In 780, during the reign of Emperor Daizong's son Emperor Dezong, Liu Yan was demoted and then killed after false accusations by Yang Yan and Yu Zhun (庾準). Cui Zao, as an associate of Liu's, was demoted to be the secretary general of Xin Prefecture (信州, in modern Shangrao, Jiangxi). As of 783, when Emperor Dezong was forced to flee from the capital Chang'an to Fengtian (奉天, in modern Xianyang, Shaanxi), due to a rebellion led by Zhu Ci, Cui was serving as the prefect of Jian Prefecture (建州, in modern Nanping, Fujian). He sent a declaration to the nearby prefectures, asking them to raise troops together to aid the emperor. He then himself took 2,000 troops from his prefecture and headed toward Fengtian. Emperor Dezong heard this and praised him. After Tang forces recaptured Chang'an in 784, he summoned Cui to Chang'an, but Cui, because his uncle Yuan Xiu (源休) had been a major contributor to Zhu's rebellion and had been executed, did not dare to head to Chang'an immediately; instead, he submitted a petition asking for punishment. Emperor Dezong, believing that he was acting appropriately, issued an edict praising and consoling him, and he made Cui Libu Langzhong (吏部郎中), a mid-level official at the ministry of the civil service affairs (吏部, Lìbu), as well as imperial attendant (給事中, Jishizhong).

In 786, Emperor Dezong, believing Cui to be brave and capable, gave Cui the designation Tong Zhongshu Menxia Pingzhangshi (同中書門下平章事), making him a chancellor de facto, along with Liu Zi and Qi Ying. As Emperor Dezong favored Cui's talent, both Liu and Qi yielded most of the responsibilities to Cui. Cui, during the time that he was living in the Yangtze River region, had long despised the institution of having various special directors for financial matters, believing the officials given those positions to be generally corrupt, so he advocated abolishing the director positions in charge of tax collection and transportation of food supplies. He advocated, and Emperor Dezong agreed, to have the tax collection responsibilities given to the local governors and prefects, and that the remaining financial responsibilities be returned to the executive bureau of government (尚書省, Shangshu Sheng). Further, the chancellors were put in charge of the six ministries of the executive bureau directly — with Cui himself in charge of the ministries of census (戶部, Hubu) and public works (工部, Gongbu); Qi in charge of the ministry of defense (兵部, Bingbu); Liu in charge of the ministries of civil service affairs and rites (禮部, Lǐbu, note different tone than the ministry of civil service affairs); and Li Mian in charge of the ministry of justice (刑部, Xingbu). Further, under Cui's recommendation, his friend Yuan Xiu (元琇, note different characters than Cui's uncle) was put in charge of the salt, iron, and wine monopolies, while Ji Zhongfu (吉中孚) was put in charge of the collected taxes.

Han Huang, the military governor (Jiedushi) of Zhenhai Circuit (鎮海, headquartered in modern Zhenjiang), on whom the imperial government relied on for food supplies at the time since there was a major famine in the Chang'an region, however, opposed these changes. To placate Han, Emperor Dezong did not abolish the office of director of Yangtze-Huai River transportation and gave that office to Han as well. Yuan requested that the responsibilities be divided — that Han be in charge of the transportation south of the Yangtze, and Yuan be in charge of the transportation north of the Yangtze. Han was not pleased, however, and submitted petitions attacking Yuan's handling of the monopolies. Emperor Dezong thus removed Yuan from his financial responsibilities and made him a secretary general of the executive bureau. When a large amount of food shipment arrived from Zhenhai to Chang'an in fall 786, Emperor Dezong was very pleased with Han and gave him the additional offices as directors of the monopolies and taxes. Further, it was popular opinion at the time that while Cui's idea to return to earlier Tang regulations might have been a good one in peace, given the desperate state the empire was in at the time after years of warfare, the director positions needed to be maintained. In addition, with Yuan no longer overseeing the monopolies, Cui himself was unable to figure out financial matters and became so distressed that he fell ill. Around new year 787, with Han advocating and Emperor Dezong agreeing that the various changes that Yuan and Cui instituted needed to be reversed, Emperor Dezong removed Cui from his chancellor post and made him a member of the staff of his crown prince Li Song. Cui died in fall 787.

== Notes and references ==
- Old Book of Tang, vol. 130.
- New Book of Tang, vol. 150.
- Zizhi Tongjian, vol. 232.
