= Zhao Jing (Tang dynasty) =

Zhao Jing (趙憬) (736 – October 3, 796), courtesy name Tuiweng (退翁), was an official of the Chinese dynasty Tang dynasty, serving as a chancellor during the reign of Emperor Dezong.

== Background ==
Zhao Jing was born in 736, during the reign of Emperor Xuanzong. His family was from Wei Prefecture (渭州, in modern Tianshui, Gansu). and traced its origins to the royal house of the Warring States period state Zhao. His great-grandfather Zhao Renben served as a chancellor during the reign of Emperor Xuanzong's grandfather Emperor Gaozong, and his grandfather Zhao Yi (趙誼) and father Zhao Daoxian (趙道先) both served in government as well. Zhao Jing himself was said to be studious, and in his youth behaved well and did not seek prominence.

== During Emperor Daizong's reign ==
In 762, after Emperor Xuanzong's grandson Emperor Daizong had just taken the throne after both Emperor Xuanzong and Emperor Daizong's father Emperor Suzong died earlier that year, the officials in charge of the emperors' funerals were discussing how the two emperors should be buried. Zhao Jing, then a commoner, submitted a petition arguing that, as there was a famine at the time and Tufan incursions, the funerals should be done in a frugal manner. He was praised by others for this petition. As a result, he later served as an official at a prefectural government, then the acting sheriff of Jiangxia County (江夏, in modern Wuhan, Hubei), and yet later successively served as an imperial censor first under the title of Jiancha Yushi (監察御史) then Dianzhong Shiyushi (殿中侍御史); and Taizi Sheren (太子舍人), a member of the staff of Emperor Daizong's crown prince Li Kuo. When his mother died, he left governmental service to observe a period of mourning for her.

== During Emperor Dezong's reign ==
In 779, Emperor Daizong died, and Li Kuo became emperor (as Emperor Dezong). Early in Emperor Dezong's Jianzhong era (780–783), with Zhao Jing's mourning period over, he was recalled to the imperial government to serve at Shuibu Yuanwailang (水部員外郎), a low-level officer at the ministry of public works (工部, Gongbu). However, before he could take office, Li Cheng (李承) the governor (觀察使, Guanchashi) of Hunan Circuit (湖南, headquartered in modern Changsha, Hunan) requested Zhao to serve as his deputy. After a year, Li Cheng died, and for some time Zhao served as acting governor. He was soon made the prefect of Hunan's capital Tan Prefecture (in modern Changsha, Hunan) and governor of Hunan. He was governor for two years before he was replaced, and after he returned to the capital Chang'an, he stayed at home and had no association with others. A long time thereafter, Emperor Dezong summoned him to the palace to meet him. As Zhao was well-learned and good at speaking, Emperor Dezong was pleased to meet him and made him an imperial attendant (給事中, Jishizhong).

In 788, Huige's Heguduolu Khan Yaoluoge Dunmohe requested to marry a Tang princess, and Emperor Dezong agreed to give Yaoluoge Dunmohe his daughter Princess Xian'an in marriage. The senior official Guan Bo was commissioned to serve as her escort, and Zhao served as Guan's deputy. At that time, Tang emissaries to Huige often used the opportunity to conduct commercial transactions for their own benefit as well, but Zhao did not do so, and people were impressed with him. After he returned from the mission, he became Shangshu Zuo Cheng (尚書左丞), one of the secretaries general of the executive bureau of government (尚書省, Shangshu Sheng). It was said that he oversaw the bureau business with diligence and integrity. At that time, Dou Can was the primary chancellor and disliked Zhao for his abilities, viewing him as a threat. He requested that Zhao be made the prefect of Tong Prefecture (同州, in modern Weinan, Shaanxi), but Emperor Dezong refused.

In 792, Dou was demoted and exiled, and Lu Zhi and Zhao (apparently at Lu's recommendation) were made chancellors with the designation Tong Zhongshu Menxia Pingzhangshi (同中書門下平章事). Both of them were also made Zhongshu Shilang (中書侍郎), the deputy head of the legislative bureau (中書省, Zhongshu Sheng). As chancellor, Zhao drafted a major six-part policy proposal with regard to the commissioning of officials:

1. That, as far as commissioning chancellors are concerned, Emperor Dezong should seek people who are capable, and not be concerned about them being perfect.
2. That the ranks of the officials should be increased, such that more talented people could be found for governmental service.
3. That the officials at the capital were being overworked and needed additional help to share their work.
4. That further effort be made to promote or demote officials in accordance with their performance.
5. That additional peer evaluations be done on officials, so that people with good performance would not be hidden from view.
6. That talented staff members of regional governors should be promoted to the imperial government.

However, as Emperor Dezong trusted Lu more, Lu was given more of the responsibilities. In 793, Zhao was made Menxia Shilang (門下侍郎), the deputy head of the examination bureau (門下省, Menxia Sheng) instead of Zhongshu Shilang, although he remained as chancellor. As the office of the chancellors was then inside the legislative bureau, Zhao suspected Lu of wanting to force him out of the key decision-making, and he resented Lu for this. Zhao thereafter often claimed to be ill in his eye and did not attend to the main policy decisions. Still, Zhao was credited for protecting such officials as Du Huangchang, Mu Zan (穆贊), Wei Wu (韋武), Li Xuan (李宣), and Lu Yun (盧雲) from suffering from false accusations. He was also credited with promoting former subordinates Linghu Heng (令狐峘) and Cui Jing (崔儆) despite their prior attempts to undermine him.

Meanwhile, despite Lu Zhi's repeatedly criticizing the official Pei Yanling as frivolous and deceitful, Emperor Dezong trusted Pei and repeatedly promoted him. Lu, not knowing that Zhao resented him with regard to Zhao's move to the examination bureau, often criticized Pei while meeting with Zhao, and Zhao leaked Lu's criticism to Pei, allowing Pei to deflect the criticism when meeting with Emperor Dezong and further strike back at Lu. On an occasion when Lu arranged to meet Emperor Dezong with Zhao, with the purpose of criticizing Pei together, Emperor Dezong became displeased when Lu did so, and Zhao watched and said nothing. Around new year 795, Lu was removed from his chancellor position, and Zhao became the main chancellor. In spring 796, on an occasion when his chancellor colleagues Jia Dan and Lu Mai were on vacation, Zhao met with Emperor Dezong alone, and on that occasion advocated the restoration of an early Tang institution — that subordinate officials be around to record the events at the meetings between the emperor and the chancellors. Emperor Dezong agreed, but as Zhao died shortly thereafter, in fall 796, the institution was not restored. Emperor Dezong mourned Zhao greatly and gave him the posthumous name Zhenxian (貞憲, meaning "virtuous and knowledgeable").

== Notes and references ==
- Old Book of Tang, vol. 138.
- New Book of Tang, vol. 150.
- Zizhi Tongjian, vols. 234, 235.
