= Li Bi =

Chinese historian, poet, and politician

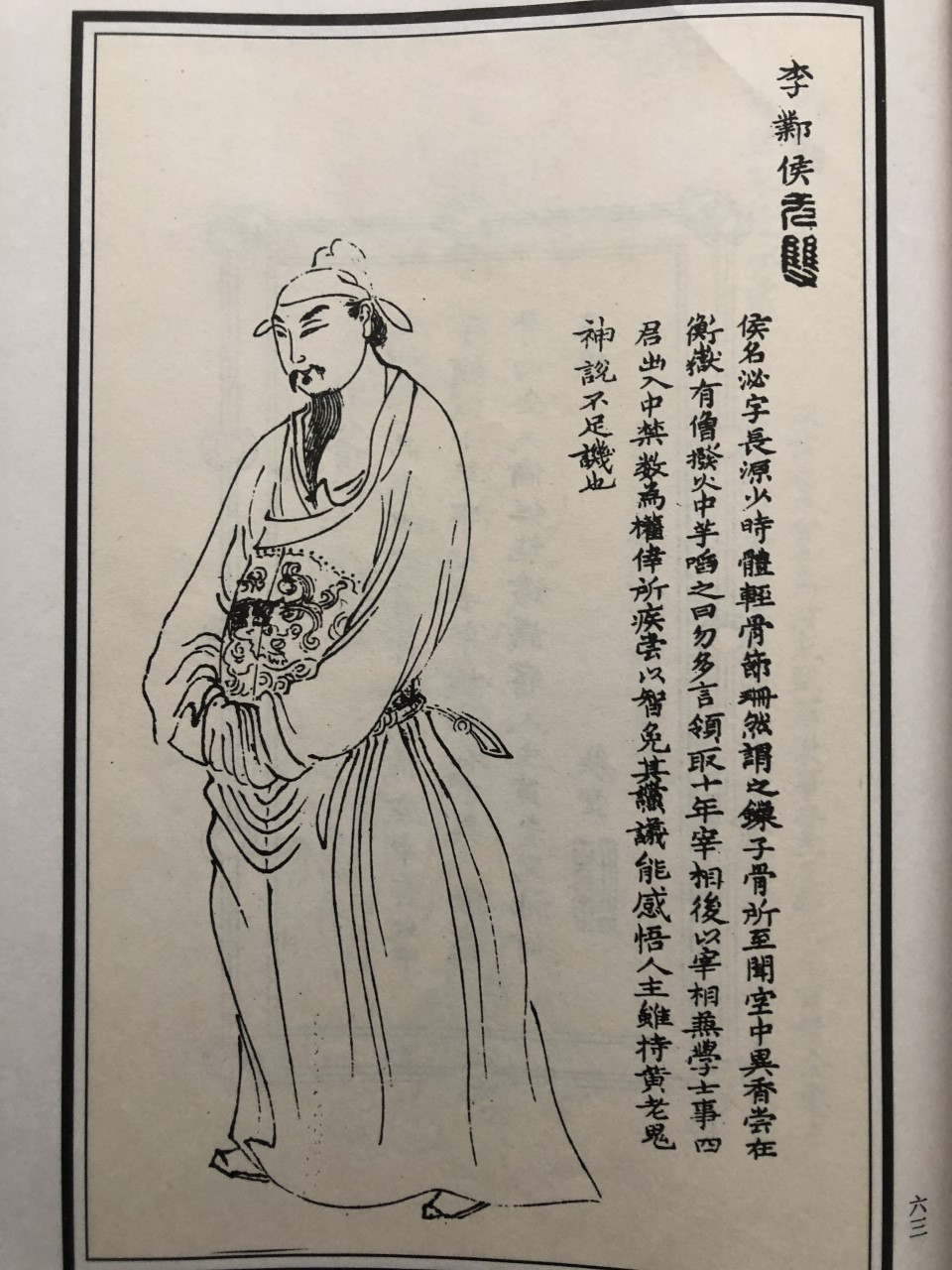
Li Bi as depicted in the Wu Shuang Pu (無雙譜, Table of Peerless Heroes) by Jin Guliang

Li Bi or Li Mi (Chinese: 李泌; 722 – April 1, 789), courtesy name Changyuan (長源), formally the Marquess of Ye County (鄴縣侯), was a Chinese historian, poet, and politician during the Tang dynasty. Li was a trusted advisor and close friend to Emperor Suzong of Tang, whom he aided in suppressing the An Lushan Rebellion, and later served as chancellor and chief civil official under Emperor Dezong. An accomplished man of letters, Li was a dedicated Taoist practitioner who cut an unusual figure at court, disentangling himself from political intrigue by leading an eremitic lifestyle and often eschewing high office to serve as personal counsellor to Emperor Suzong and his successors, Emperor Daizong and Emperor Dezong. Li's strategies helped stabilize the Tang state during a chaotic era marked by rebellion, warfare, and tension with foreign powers, though his influence and perceived eccentricity drew criticism from contemporary rivals and some traditional historians. Li is one of the 40 prominent figures memorialized in the Wu Shuang Pu by Jin Guliang.

== Background ==
Li Bi was born in 722, during the reign of Emperor Xuanzong. His family was from the Tang dynasty capital Chang'an, but his ancestors claimed order from Liaodong Peninsula ,he was 4×-great-grandson of Li Bi,who is one of the Eight Zhuguo Of Western Wei. Li Bi's father Li Chengxiu (李承休) was a county magistrate.

== During Emperor Xuanzong's reign ==
It was said that Li Bi could read and write by age six, and that in his youth, he was known for his intelligence and dexterity. That year, when Emperor Xuanzong put out a general order requesting people to recommend those well-versed in Buddhism, Taoism, and Confucianism, the officials all recommended those whom they knew. An eight-year-old named Yuan Chu (員俶), a grandson of the great scholar Yuan Banqian (員半千) and a cousin to Li Bi (Yuan Chu's mother was a sister to Li Chengxiu), particularly impressed Emperor Xuanzong. When Emperor Xuanzong asked Yuan Chu whether he knew anyone else like him, Yuan Chu replied that Li Bi was one. Emperor Xuanzong thus summoned Li Bi. When Li Bi arrived, Emperor Xuanzong was playing Go with the high-level official Zhang Shuo the Duke of Yan, and Zhang, wanting to test the child, asked to make up a poem comparing Go to life and recite it. Zhang then recited the poem that he thought of on the spot, and Li Bi immediately followed with one of his own. Both Emperor Xuanzong and Zhang were amazed, and Zhang congratulated Emperor Xuanzong on finding a divine child. Emperor Xuanzong gave Li Bi an award and honored his household. He also had Li Bi associate with his son Li Jun the Prince of Zhong.

Li Bi became learned in the Confucian classics and the histories, but was particularly well-learned in the I Ching. He was also a talented writer and wrote poems well, and he had great ambitions to assist emperors. He was honored by officials such as Zhang Jiuling, Wei Xuxin (韋虛心), and Zhang Tinggui (張廷珪). Zhang Jiuling, in particular, treated him as a friend notwithstanding the age and position differences. Li Bi, however, did not like to be restricted by governmental regulations, and as he grew older often journeyed among Mount Song, Mount Hua, and the Qinling Mountains, seeking out for the alchemist arts that could lead to longevity. During the middle of Emperor Xuanzong's Tianbao era (742–756), Li Bi submitted a petition from Mount Song discussing the affairs of state. Emperor Xuanzong, remembering the meetings when he was young, summoned him to Chang'an and made Li Bi an attendant to Li Jun – whose name had been changed to Li Heng by that point and who had become crown prince. However, after Li Bi wrote some poems satirizing such powerful figures as Yang Guozhong and An Lushan, Yang became displeased and requested that Li Bi be exiled to Qichun Commandery (蘄春, in modern Huanggang, Hubei). Only after a pardon was Li Bi allowed to return to Chang'an. Thereafter, he took no governmental positions and became a hermit at Yingyang (潁陽, in modern Zhengzhou, Henan).

== During Emperor Suzong's reign ==
In 755, An Lushan rebelled at Fanyang, and by summer 756, forces of his new state of Yan reached Chang'an, forcing Emperor Xuanzong to flee to Chengdu. Li Heng, however, did not follow Emperor Xuanzong to Chengdu, but instead fled to Lingwu, where he was declared emperor (as Emperor Suzong). He summoned Li Bi to Lingwu to serve as an advisor, and Li Bi did so. It was said that they spent so much together discussing the affairs of the military and the state that they often slept in the same bedroom, just like the times when Emperor Suzong was just a prince. It was said that Emperor Suzong consulted Li Bi on every matter, including military commissions. He wanted to make Li Bi Zhongshu Ling (中書令) – the head of the legislative bureau of government (中書省) and a post considered one for a chancellor – but Li Bi declined, stating, "I find it much more honored that Your Imperial Majesty treats me as a guest and a friend, than as a chancellor. Why do you want me to take an inferior position?"

Thereafter, when Emperor Suzong wanted to make his son Li Tan the Prince of Jianning, who was known for his military talent, the supreme commander of the armed forces, Li Bi pointed out that awkwardness would then come to the issue of imperial succession given that Li Tan was younger than his brother Li Chu the Prince of Guangping. Emperor Suzong agreed and gave the title of supreme commander to Li Chu instead. Li Tan, however, did not resent Li Bi for this and thanked Li Bi for his suggestion. It was said that at that time, the soldiers, whenever they saw Emperor Suzong and Li Bi surveying the troops together, the soldiers would comment: "The one who wears the yellow robe is the holy one [(i.e., emperor)]. The one who wears the white robe is the mystical one." Emperor Suzong, hearing this, told Li Bi to put on the purple robe of a high-level official, and Li Bi reluctantly agreed. Subsequently, Emperor Suzong gave him the title of imperial advisor (侍謀軍國, Shimou Junguo) as well as Li Chu's secretary general. From that point on, he and Li Chu would rotate to be on duty at the army headquarters, ready to act on the generals' reports; when Li Chu was attending to Emperor Suzong, Li Bi would be at headquarters, and when Li Bi was attending to Emperor Suzong, Li Chu would be at headquarters. Emperor Suzong also gave the keys to the makeshift palace to Li Chu and Li Bi. Whenever there were generals' requests that needed immediate action, Li Chu and Li Bi would act on them, and whenever further approval from Emperor Suzong were necessary, they would take them to the palace and submit to Emperor Suzong through a slot in the door. In fall 756, at Li Bi's suggestion, Emperor Suzong moved his headquarters from Lingwu to Pengyuan (彭原, in modern Qingyang, Gansu), to better coordinate the troops coming to his aid.

Also in fall 756, however, Li Bi and Li Tan both offended Emperor Suzong's favorite concubine Consort Zhang. Emperor Suzong had been considering creating Consort Zhang empress, but, as Li Bi advised him that it was inappropriate to do so before he had a chance to seek the approval of Emperor Xuanzong (whom he honored as Taishang Huang (retired emperor)), he decided to wait. Meanwhile, however, around this time Emperor Xuanzong sent Consort Zhang a saddle with seven kinds of jewels studded on it as a gift. Li Bi opined that in the difficult times, it would be inappropriate for her to use such a luxurious item, and therefore suggested instead that the jewels be removed and rewarded to those soldiers with accomplishments. Emperor Suzong agreed – and Li Tan publicly praised the decision, causing Consort Zhang to thereafter bear much resentment toward Li Bi and Li Tan. Meanwhile, in winter 756, after the chancellor Fang Guan failed to recapture Chang'an and suffered heavy losses, Emperor Suzong initially wanted to punish Fang, but at Li Bi's intercession, did not do so.

Meanwhile, Li Bi also suggested to Emperor Suzong his plan of destroying Yan:

- That the major generals Li Guangbi and Guo Ziyi be sent to the region north of the Yellow River to engage the Yan generals Shi Siming, Zhang Zhongzhi, so that Shi and Zhang would be unable to move south.
- That meanwhile, Emperor Suzong himself not attack, but continue to stay close to Chang'an, so that the Yan generals An Shouzhong (安守忠) and Tian Qianzhen (田乾真), then at Chang'an, would be unable to move east.
- That Li Guangbi and Guo then launch periodic attacks against Yan troops, such that the Yan forces would be forced to constantly move and become worn out.
- That in spring 757, Li Tan be sent to join Li Guangbi to capture Fanyang, and then the Tang armies could then converge toward An Lushan's capital at Luoyang and attack it.

Emperor Suzong was happy about the plan. Meanwhile, however, Consort Zhang entered into an alliance with Emperor Suzong's trusted eunuch Li Fuguo, and together the two became powerful inside the palace, purportedly carrying out much misdeeds. Li Tan considered trying to kill them, and despite Li Bi's advice to the contrary, Li Tan did not stop his planning. In 757, Consort Zhang and Li Fuguo struck first, accusing Li Tan of plotting to kill Li Chu, and Emperor Suzong, believing their accusation, forced Li Tan to commit suicide. This caused Li Chu and Li Bi to be fearful of her as well, although at Li Bi's urging, Li Chu did not himself try to kill them. Around this time, Emperor Suzong also consulted Li Bi on what his thoughts were on how to reward the generals after Yan's destruction, and Li Bi advocated that the generals be given fiefdoms so that they would want to pass them to their descendants. (Emperor Suzong initially agreed, but the plan was never actually implemented in Emperor Suzong's reign or after.)

Later in spring 757, Emperor Suzong advanced to Fengxiang (鳳翔, in modern Baoji, Shaanxi). Aid troops from Anxi Circuit (安西, headquartered in modern Aksu Prefecture, Xinjiang, as well as Xiyu states, were arriving, and Li Bi, as he had previously suggested, advocated that the troops be sent to attack Fanyang first, to root out Yan's power base, before attempts should be made to recapture Chang'an and Luoyang. This time, however, Emperor Suzong overruled him, stating that he wanted to capture Chang'an as soon as possible to welcome Emperor Xuanzong back to the capital, despite Li Bi's objections that doing so would prolong the rebellion in that the Anxi and Xiyu troops could not bear the heat and would be worn out after recapturing Chang'an and Luoyang. (As it turned out, whether it was due to Emperor Suzong's decision to overrule Li Bi or not, the rebellion would not be completely put down until 763.)

In summer 757, with major aid from Huige, Tang forces commanded by Li Chu recaptured Chang'an. Emperor Suzong entered Chang'an and sent messengers to bring Li Bi to Chang'an. Upon Li Bi's arrival in Chang'an, Emperor Suzong informed Li Bi that he had sent messengers to Emperor Xuanzong requesting that he return to Chang'an and offering the throne back to Emperor Xuanzong. Li Bi pointed out that this would cause Emperor Xuanzong to be apprehensive as to Emperor Suzong's sincerity, and as Li Bi predicted, Emperor Xuanzong initially not only declined but further requested to remain in Jiannan Circuit (劍南, headquartered in modern Chengdu). Only after Emperor Suzong, at Li Bi's suggestion, had the government officials make a joint submission to Emperor Xuanzong no longer mentioning the return of the throne, did Emperor Xuanzong agree to depart Jiannan to return to Chang'an.

Thereafter, Li Bi requested to resign his positions and return to the mountains as a hermit. Emperor Suzong was surprised and stated to Li Bi that this was time for him to be rewarded. Li Bi stated that if he stayed, he would die because people (apparently referring to Consort Zhang and Li Fuguo, although his biography in the New Book of Tang also referred to the chancellor Cui Yuan) would be jealous of him for five reasons – that he had too long of an association with Emperor Suzong; that Emperor Suzong trusted him too much; that Emperor Suzong treated him too well; that he had too much accomplishments; and that their friendship was too legendary. Emperor Suzong initially guessed that the real reason for his wanting to leave was Emperor Suzong's refusal to follow his advice on attacking Fanyang first, but Li Bi then stated that it was because of Li Tan's death. He argued to Emperor Suzong that Li Tan was innocent, and that by this point, there would surely be false accusations against Li Chu as well, and that he should not listen to them. With Li Bi insisting on resigning, Emperor Suzong allowed him to return to hermit life at Mount Heng, and had the local government there build him a hermitage and supply him with supplies due a high-level official (of the third rank). While he was at his hermitage, he got into the habit of using pine branches to make back supports, and on one occasion, when he saw one in the shape of a dragon, he sent it to Emperor Suzong as a gift.

== During Emperor Daizong's reign ==
Emperor Suzong died in 762 and was succeeded by Li Chu (as Emperor Daizong), whose name had been changed to Li Yu by this point. Li Bi remained a hermit at Mount Heng, but later, Emperor Daizong sent eunuchs to Mount Heng to summon him to Chang'an. When Li Bi arrived, Emperor Daizong built him a study next to the palace, and, while he gave Li Bi a purple robe to wear again, he and Li Bi often met in civilian clothes, and he consulted Li Bi on major decisions. He also had the powerful eunuch Yu Chao'en build Li Bi a vacation home. He wanted to make Li Bi a chancellor, but Li Bi declined. At one Duanwu Festival, however, when officials were offering gifts to Emperor Daizong, Emperor Daizong demanded a gift from Li Bi – himself. He wanted Li Bi, who had been a vegetarian and celibate and also abstained from alcohol, to marry, observe a normal diet, and become an official. Under persuasion from Emperor Daizong, Li Bi agreed and married a Lady Lu, a niece of the deceased general Li Wei (李暐). Emperor Daizong further bestowed him a mansion and but continued to have him live part of the time in the palace. In 768, after consulting with Li Bi, he posthumously honored Li Tan an emperor.

In 770, Emperor Daizong, in conjunction with the chancellor Yuan Zai, killed Yu. Thereafter, Yuan became jealous of Li Bi's close association with the emperor and accused Li Bi of having been Yu's associate. Emperor Daizong, not wanting to be in a confrontation with Yuan, sent Li Bi to Jiangxi Circuit (江西, headquartered in modern Nanchang, Jiangxi) to serve as the secretary to Jiangxi's governor Wei Shaoyou (魏少遊). After Yuan was executed in 777 for corruption, Emperor Daizong recalled Li Bi to the capital. However, soon, the new chancellor Chang Gun, also jealous of Li Bi, requested to have Li Bi sent out to be a prefectural prefect – arguing that if Li Bi were to become a chancellor in the future, he should have administrative experience. Emperor Daizong agreed, and in 779 sent Li Bi out to be the prefect of Li Prefecture (澧州, in modern Changde, Hunan), as well as serving as the commander of the prefectural militia of two neighboring prefectures.

== During Emperor Dezong's reign ==
=== Prior to chancellorship ===
In 779, Emperor Daizong died and was succeeded by his son Emperor Dezong. Li Bi had previously taught Emperor Dezong, who was then the Prince of Fengjie, when Emperor Suzong was at Lingwu. However, Emperor Dezong did not recall Li Bi initially. By 784, when rebellions by Zhu Ci and Li Huaiguang forced Emperor Dezong to flee to Liang Prefecture (梁州, in modern Hanzhong, Shaanxi), Li Bi was serving as the prefect of Hang Prefecture (杭州, in modern Hangzhou, Zhejiang). Emperor Dezong summoned Li Bi; Li Bi and Du Ya (杜亞), the prefect of neighboring Mu Prefecture (睦州, also in modern Hangzhou), thus reported to Liang Prefecture. After Zhu's rebellion was destroyed later in the year, allowing Emperor Dezong to return to Chang'an, Emperor Dezong made Li Bi Zuo Sanqi Changshi (左散騎常侍), a high level consultant at the examination bureau (門下省, Menxia Sheng). It was said that other officials and the public were all piqued and ready to see what Li Bi would advise the emperor about. At that time, Emperor Dezong was concerned that Li Huaiguang, who was then controlling the region of Hezhong Municipality (河中, in modern Yuncheng, Shanxi), would continue to create problems for the imperial government, but Li Bi pointed out that Li Huaiguang himself lacked powerful messages to keep his subordinates obedient to him, apparently alleviating some of Emperor Dezong's concerns. Li Bi further spoke on behalf of Han Huang, the military governor (Jiedushi) of Zhenhai Circuit (鎮海, headquartered in modern Zhenjiang, Jiangsu), whom Emperor Dezong had been suspicious of, and subsequently, Emperor Dezong sent messengers, including Han Huang's son Han Gao (韓皐), to Zhenhai to show that he had no further apprehensions of Han Huang. Han Huang, in gratitude, sent the imperial government a large supply of rice, allowing the Chang'an region to recover from a major famine.

In 785, after Zhang Quan (張勸), the military governor of Shanguo Circuit (陝虢, headquartered in modern Sanmenxia, Henan), was assassinated by his subordinate Daxi Baohui (達奚抱暉) and Daxi took over the circuit, Emperor Dezong, concerned that Daxi Baohui would join Li Huaiguang, sent Li Bi to Shanguo to try to calm the situation. Li Bi, initially claiming that he was only there to make sure that the food supplies would continue to flow through the circuit to Chang'an, initially promised that he would recommend Daxi to succeed Zhang. However, after he settled the situation down, he secretly persuaded Daxi that the only way for him to save himself was to flee. Daxi did so, and Li Bi took over the circuit. Emperor Dezong gave him the title of defender (防禦使, Fangyushi) rather than military governor. In 786, Li Bi built a new road to allow supply shipment over land, to avoid the rapids where the Wei River flowed into the Yellow River. In 787, when soldiers sent from Huaixi Circuit (淮西, headquartered in modern Zhumadian, Henan) to join the defense against Tufan in the west suddenly mutinied and tried to head back to Huaixi, pillaging on the way, Li Bi intercepted them and crushed them.

=== Chancellorship ===
Later in 787, Emperor Dezong summoned Li Bi back to Chang'an and made him Zhongshu Shilang (中書侍郎), the deputy head of the legislative bureau. He also gave Li Bi the designation Tong Zhongshu Menxia Pingzhangshi (同中書門下平章事), making him a chancellor de facto, and created him the Marquess of Ye. At their first meeting with Li Bi as chancellor, and with other chancellors Li Sheng, Ma Sui, and Liu Hun present as well, Emperor Dezong wanted Li Bi to promise not to carry past grudges against those who had harmed him, and Li Bi, after stating that he had no real enemies and that such persons who had been jealous of him as Li Fuguo and Yuan Zai had already died, in turn wanted Emperor Dezong to promise the safety of both Li Sheng and Ma Sui – both of whom had been instrumental in ending the rebellions and restoring his rule, against any false accusations that might be made against them. Emperor Dezong agreed.

Li Bi immediately presented to Emperor Dezong the proposal to reverse cuts in the ranks of the governmental officials that fellow chancellor Zhang Yanshang had carried out, pointing out that the reduced ranks were unable to carry out the affairs of government. He also refused Emperor Dezong's attempts to divide governmental responsibilities between chancellors – pointing out that chancellors should oversee all government affairs. Emperor Dezong agreed to both of his proposals.

Meanwhile, Zhang, who had a grudge against Li Shuming (李叔明) the military governor of Dongchuan Circuit (東川, headquartered in modern Mianyang, Sichuan), discovered that Li Shuming's son Li Shēng (李昇, note different tone than the famous general), along with several other young officials, were often secretly visiting Emperor Dezong's aunt Princess Gao, whose daughter was the wife and crown princess of Emperor Dezong's son and crown prince Li Song. He informed this to Emperor Dezong, intimating that Li Shēng was having an affair with Princess Gao. When Emperor Dezong asked Li Bi to investigate this, however, Li Bi correctly guessed that it was Zhang who informed Emperor Dezong of this and suggested no investigation, pointing out that Zhang's accusations also appeared to be intended to endanger Li Song. Emperor Dezong agreed, and thereafter moved Li Shēng to the position of head of Li Song's household, away from Princess Gao.

Meanwhile, with the public owing much tax debt, Li Bi suggested the granting of a general tax amnesty if the people would admit to what they owed and paid a fraction thereof. Emperor Dezong agreed, and it was said that the amnesty helped the treasury to recover much of its losses. He also required the emissaries from foreign states – who had stayed in Chang'an ever since An Lushan's rebellion but who continued to receive stipends from the Tang government – to make an election whether to return home or to become Tang citizens and not receive the diplomat stipends. The emissaries all decided to stay despite the lack of stipends; they largely became military officers and soldiers, strengthening the imperial guard corps while reducing public expense.

Emperor Dezong and Li Bi discussed the return to the corvée conscription system – which had been used early in Tang history but had been abolished by the time of Emperor Xuanzong. Li Bi, who had initially advocated for its return, by that point was pointing out that the treasury could not afford paying the expenses of such a system. He instead proposed using various measures, including the offers of free land, to encourage soldiers to settle on the borders with Tufan and become farmer-soldiers. Emperor Dezong agreed, and with the offers of free land, it was said that some 50% to 60% of soldiers sent to the Tufan frontier decided to stay in the region. After Liu was removed in late 787, Li Bi was effectively the sole chancellor, with no other civilian officials carrying chancellor title. (Ma, Li Shèng, and Hun Jian carried chancellor titles but were generals.)

By late 787, the matters with Princess Guo flared up, as she continued her affairs with Li Shēng and the other young officers, but was exposed in her affairs by other nobles. She was also accused of using witchcraft against Emperor Dezong. Emperor Dezong, in anger, imprisoned her, and further suspected Li Song of being complicit. Li Song, in fear, divorced Princess Guo's daughter Crown Princess Xiao, but Emperor Dezong continued to be incensed, considering deposing Li Song and replacing Li Song with another son Li Yi (李誼) the Prince of Shu – who was actually his biological nephew, whom he adopted after Li Yi's biological father, his brother Li Biao (李邈) the Prince of Zheng, died early. Li Bi earnestly protested Li Song's innocence, and at one point appeared to be at the risk of being the object of Emperor Dezong's wrath himself. Eventually, Emperor Dezong's wrath subsided, particularly after Li Bi pointed out the example of what happened to Li Tan, and Li Song was spared.

Meanwhile, Emperor Dezong complained that he had insufficient funds for use in the palace. Li Bi instituted a new system where a part of the tax revenues were designated for the emperor's personal use, to try to stop Emperor Dezong from personally extracting tributes from local governments – as that was causing the local officials to in turn extract them from the people, above and beyond the regular tax burden. However, even with Li Bi's new budgeting, Emperor Dezong continued to demand tributes from local governments and further instructed them not to inform Li Bi. When Li Bi found out, he was upset, but chose not to try to stop Emperor Dezong again.

Also in late 787, Li Bi finally proposed his plan for counterattacks against Tufan – enter alliances with Huige, Nanzhao, and the Abbasid Caliphate, with the alliance with Huige being the most urgent. However, Emperor Dezong hated the Huige, ever since several of his attendants were tortured and killed by Huige's Maoyu Khan Yaoluoge Yidijian (藥羅葛移地健) in 762 while he was still a prince, and therefore refused. Only after repeated attempts by Li Bi that that grudge should not be borne against the current khan, the Hegu Khan Yaoluoge Dunmohe (藥羅葛頓莫賀) as well as repeated analyses of how crucial the Huige alliance would be did Emperor Dezong agree – particularly after Li Bi, who had strong friendships with both Yaoluoge Dunmohe and the Huige chancellor Baipodi (白婆帝), extracted promises from Yaoluoge Dunmohe to submit to Tang as a subject, as a matter of formality. Emperor Dezong was pleased, and subsequently, the treaty was cemented with the betrothal of Emperor Dezong's daughter Princess Xian'an to Yaoluoge Dunmohe. Meanwhile, Li Bi requested to have another chancellor named, but Emperor Dezong declined, pointing out that he could not find another person with the same talent.

By 789, Li Bi was seriously ill, and only then did Emperor Dezong agree to name more chancellors. At Li Bi's recommendation, Emperor Dezong made Dong Jin and Dou Can chancellors as well. Li Bi died soon thereafter.

== Historians' views of Li Bi ==
The historians' views on Li Bi were highly mixed. The editors of the Old Book of Tang did not view Li Bi's chancellorship highly, believing that he lacked contributions while serving as chancellor and criticizing him for his Taoist cultivation and frequent discussions of Taoism, although it referred to Li Bi as highly intelligent with good ideas. The lead editor, the Later Jin historian Liu Xu, commented:

Li Bi had clear understanding and high intelligence, knowing that it is easier to advance in position than to retreat. However, when he served as a chancellor, he spent much time talking about gods and ghosts. This showed how he was frivolous and senseless. The Royal Regulations [(a component of the Classic of Rites)] stated, "One who disturbs government with sorcery should be killed." Did he have no fear of this?

The lead editor of the New Book of Tang, the Song dynasty historian Ouyang Xiu, was more complimentary, although he was also critical of Li Bi, believing that he became chancellor in Emperor Dezong's reign only because Emperor Dezong became more superstitious as his reign went on:

Li Bi's behavior was most unusual. His advice were faithful; his departures were frivolous; his self-protections were intelligent; and his accomplishments as chancellor were like those with great contributions. I see that when Emperor Suzong established his temporary court in the wilderness, even those who made a single good suggestion was entrusted with power. At that time, Li Bi made many suggestions that were accepted, and he also aided Emperor Daizong in recapturing the two capitals. He refused to be entered into the official registers at the time, however. Is it really that the two emperors were unwilling to make him chancellor? Late in Emperor Dezong's reign, the emperor became attached to matters of gods and ghosts, and Li Bi became powerful. That was because Emperor Dezong thought that he was the only one who could get Li Bi to help him.

Contrary to the Old Book of Tang and the New Book of Tang, which had relatively short records of Li Bi's deeds, Sima Guang, also of the Song dynasty, included extensive records of Li Bi's contributions in his Zizhi Tongjian – but personally wrote only a short comment about Li Bi, stating: (Note: In his Zizhi Tongjian Kaoyi, Sima also claimed that Li Bi told Emperor Suzong that "Xiaojing (Li Hong's posthumous name) was poisoned". Sima then theorized that the record in Li Hong's biography in New Book of Tang (that Li Hong was poisoned) was based on this conversation and the indirect record found in the Tang Li.)

Li Bi had many strategies, but he liked to talk about gods and ghosts, and those things sounded ridiculous. Therefore, he was looked on lightly by others.

The commentator to the Zizhi Tongjian, Hu Sanxing, toward the end of the Song dynasty, was in turn very complimentary of Li Bi, believing that his devotion in Taoism was a way to avoid getting in danger, while making exceptional contributions during the reigns of three emperors. His view was shared by the modern historian Bo Yang, who even ranked Li Bi to be the most talented Chinese chancellor since Wang Meng. Bo was particularly complimentary of Li Bi's suggestions that led to the gradual alleviation of Tufan attacks against Tang.

== In popular culture ==
Li Bi is a main character in the 2019 Chinese television series The Longest Day in Chang'an, a period thriller set early in Emperor Xuanzong's Tianbao era (742–756). Portrayed by Jackson Yee, Li is depicted as a Taoist adept attired in daojiao fushi, an ambitious government official, and a trusted confidant of Crown Prince Li Yu (a fictional character modeled after a young Emperor Suzong). In the series, Li serves as chief of Chang'an's Peacekeeper Corps, an imperial intelligence agency under the supervision of He Zhizheng (a senior government official and poet modeled after the historical figure He Zhizhang).

== Notes and references ==
- Old Book of Tang, vol. 130.
- New Book of Tang, vol. 139.
- Zizhi Tongjian, vols. 218, 219, 220, 224, 225, 231, 232, 233.
