= Dou Can =

Tang Chinese official

Dou Can or Dou Shen (Chinese: 竇參; 734–793), courtesy name Shizhong (時中), was an official of the Chinese Tang dynasty, serving as a chancellor during the reign of Emperor Dezong. He was known for being a capable judge before becoming chancellor, but was considered a partisan power monger as a chancellor, eventually drawing Emperor Dezong's ire and leading to his demotion and later forced suicide.

== Background ==
Dou Shen was born in 734, during the reign of Emperor Xuanzong. His ancestors were originally Xianbei nobles of Northern Wei with the clan name Gedouling (紇豆陵), and further claimed that they were descended from the Han dynasty official Dou Wu and fled to Xianbei realms after Dou Wu was killed in 168 after a failed struggle with powerful eunuchs. Dou Shen's Northern Wei ancestors, after assuming the surname of Dou during the change of Xianbei names to Han names regime that Emperor Xiaowu of Northern Wei instituted, were ancestors in the line to officials of Western Wei and Sui dynasty, before the early Tang dynasty chancellor Dou Kang, who was Dou Shen's great-great-great-grandfather. Dou Shen's grandfather Dou Jin (竇瑾) was not recorded with any official titles, but Dou Shen's father Dou Shenyan (竇審言) served as a county magistrate.

== Early career ==
Dou Shen learned about laws and administrative regulations when he was young. It was said that he had a stern and decisive personality. Because of his heritage, he became an official in his young age, and eventually became the sheriff of Wannian County (萬年), one of the two counties making up the Tang capital Chang'an. On one night, one of his colleagues was supposed to be on duty in watching the prisoners but asked Dou to fill in for him because his relative was ill. Dou agreed. That night, some prisoners escaped, and his superior, the mayor of Jingzhao Municipality (京兆, i.e., the Chang'an region) read the rotation schedule and saw that Dou's colleague was to be on duty. He was set to punish Dou's colleague, when Dou stated that it was he who watched the prisoners and should be held responsible. As a result, he was sent out of the capital to be the magistrate of Jiangxia County (江夏, in modern Wuhan, Hubei), but received praise for his honesty.

Eventually, he was promoted to be the sheriff of Fengxian County (奉先, near Chang'an). One of the residents of Fengxian, Cao Fen (曹芬), was nominally a soldier of the imperial guards, but was known for his violence. On one occasion, when Cao was drunk, he battered his sister; his father tried to stop the battering, but could not, and in distress committed suicide by jumping into a well. Dou arrested Cao and his brothers and sentenced them to death. His subordinates wanted to spare them because their father had just died, but Dou responded:

These sons were born because of their fathers, and their father died because of the sons. If they can be spared because they lost their father, it is that they receive no due punishment for killing their father.

Dou then caned them to death, and this terrified the people of the county. He later became Dali Sizhi (大理司直), a judge at the supreme court (大理寺). On one occasion, he was sent to the Yangtze River-Huai River region to rule on cases in that region. When he arrived at Yang Prefecture (揚州, in modern Yangzhou, Jiangsu), the military governor of Huainan Circuit (淮南, headquartered at Yang Prefecture), Chen Shaoyou (陳少遊), who was arrogant, did not personally welcome him as per regulations but only sent subordinates to do so. Dou rebuked them and refused to meet them. Chen, in fear, apologized. It was further said that Dou served well on this mission. In particular, at that time, Deng Ting (鄧珽) the prefect of Wu Prefecture (婺州, in modern Jinhua, Zhejiang) was accused of receiving a large amount of bribes, and his assets were set to be seized to satisfy the penalty. Deng, however, was friendly with the chancellors at that time, and Dou's colleagues largely, wanting to ingratiate the chancellors, wanted to exempt Deng. Dou, however, stood firm and wanted to collect Deng's assets, and he was able to prevail. The next year, he became Jiancha Yushi (監察御史), an imperial censor. At that time, Ma Yi (馬彝), the secretary to the governor of Hunan Circuit (湖南, headquartered in modern Changsha, Hunan), was falsely accused of crimes, because he had punished a subordinate for receiving bribes and in turn was accused by that subordinate's son. Dou was sent to judge Ma, and he was able to tell that Ma was innocent.

Dou later was promoted in his censor rank to Dianzhong Shi Yushi (殿中侍御史). He then successively served as Jinbu Yuanwailang (金部員外郎), a low-level official at the ministry of census (戶部, Hubu); Xingbu Langzhong (刑部郎中), a supervisorial low-level official at the ministry of justice (刑部, Xingbu); and Shiyushi (侍御史), a higher level censor. He was yet later promoted to be Yushi Zhongcheng (御史中丞), the deputy chief imperial censor. He was said to be stern in his rulings and unafraid of powerful men. As a result, he gained favor from Emperor Dezong and was often summoned to give Emperor Dezong advice. He often disagreed with the chancellors' suggestions, and the chancellors tried to find fault in him, but could find nothing to damage him with. However, it was also said that, by this point, he was letting his own desires interfere with his enforcement of law. For example, when he was involved in setting salaries for the officials, he set the salary for the Yushi Sizhi higher than that of Yushi Cheng (御史丞, secretaries general), who were of the same rank, because he had been Sizhi before. Further, when he was setting regulations on the order of precedence the officials should have when meeting the emperor, he disliked Li Bian (李昪), a staff member of the crown prince Li Song with the title of Taizi Zhanshi (太子詹事), and therefore had Taizi Zhanshi listed after the deputy mayors of the special municipalities — even though Taizi Zhanshi carried a higher rank and traditionally was more honored. For this, he began to receive criticism.

Dou soon took on the additional office of deputy minister of census (戶部侍郎, Hubu Shilang). There was an occasion when a Chang'an farmer had a pig that had two heads. His subordinates believed that this to be a sign of fortune and wanted to report it to the emperor. Dou responded, "This is one monstrous pig. How can it be reported to the emperor?" He ordered that the pig be abandoned. In another incident, Chen Shaoyou's son Chen Zhengyi (陳正儀), after Chen Shaoyou's death, requested to be allowed to inherit Chen Shaoyou's title. Dou publicly wrote a statement and posted it on the front door of the executive bureau of government (尚書省, Shangshu Sheng):

Chen Shaoyou carried the titles of both general and chancellor. When the situation was dangerous, and his lord and emperor had to suffer dust, he did not come to the emperor's aid. How foolish is his son such that he wanted to inherit Chen Shaoyou's title!

Chen Zhengyi, in fear, left without further requesting to inherit the title. Around this time, the generals Meng Hua (孟華) and Li Jianyu (李建玉) were both falsely accused of crimes and set to be sentenced to death, and they could not show their innocence. Dou, however, was able to discern their innocence and obtain their releases. As a result, the popular sentiment at the time had great expectations for Dou.

== Chancellorship ==
Meanwhile, though, Dou Shen drew the attention of the chancellor Li Mi, and Li repeatedly recommended both him and Dong Jin, believing that Dou was capable in financial matters and Dong was morally upright. Emperor Dezong initially did not agree with Li's assessment, but in 789, with Li being seriously ill, he again recommended Dou and Dong, and Emperor Dezong finally agreed. He made Dou Zhongshu Shilang (中書侍郎), the deputy head of the legislative bureau (中書省, Zhongshu Sheng) as well as the director of financial affairs. He also gave both Dou and Dong the designation Tong Zhongshu Menxia Pingzhangshi (同中書門下平章事), making them chancellors de facto. Li died shortly after, and it was said that while both Dou and Dong were chancellors, Dou had greater grasp of power and put many of his associates in powerful positions. He often met Emperor Dezong alone, under the guise of discussing financial matters. It was said that generals and regional warlords all feared him, and in particular, Li Na the military governor of Pinglu Circuit (平盧, headquartered in modern Tai'an, Shandong), sent him gifts, ostensibly to honor him, but instead intending to discredit him. Emperor Dezong's close associates also disliked Dou and often defamed him.

In fall 791, Dou, as he disliked Emperor Dezong's trusted advisor, the imperial scholar Lu Zhi, had Lu made the deputy minister of defense (兵部侍郎, Bingbu Shilang) — ostensibly a promotion, but instead a way to cause distance between Emperor Dezong and Lu. Meanwhile, Dou also disliked Wu Cou (吳湊) the governor of Fujian Circuit (福建, headquartered in modern Fuzhou, Fujian) — a maternal uncle of Emperor Dezong's father Emperor Daizong. Even though Wu had good reputation as the governor of Fujian, Dou reported to Emperor Dezong that Wu had been stricken by arthritis and rendered immobile. Emperor Dezong recalled Wu to Chang'an and had Wu walk before him. He saw that Wu was not immobile, and thereafter began to dislike Dou for his false reporting. He made Wu the governor Shanguo Circuit (陝虢, headquartered in modern Sanmenxia, Henan) to displace Dou's associate Li Yi (李翼).

Meanwhile, Emperor Dezong's original choice for the director of finances, Ban Hong (班宏), who was made Dou's deputy, had been promised by Dou that he would become director after Dou had served for one year, but after one year, Dou continued to hold onto the position with no intent to yield it, drawing Ban's anger. Only after Dou became aware of Emperor Dezong's displeasure with him did he yield the post to Ban, in spring 792. Dou, however, chose Ban's deputy, Zhang Pang (張滂) to divide Ban's power.

Meanwhile, Dou's nephew Dou Shen (竇申), an imperial attendant, was very close to Dou Shen, and Dou Shen often discussed with him personnel movements before they were announced. Dou Shen thus often used this information to extract bribes from others by informing the subjects of promotions in advance — such that he gained the nickname of "Magpie" (because the Chinese believed that magpies were foretellers of good fortune). Even Emperor Dezong heard of Dou Shen's reputation and suggested Dou Shen to send Dou Shen out of the capital, but Dou Shen guaranteed to Emperor Dezong that Dou Shen would not cause trouble. Dou Shen closely associated with his maternal uncle Li Zezhi (李則之) the Prince of Guo and the imperial scholar Wu Tongxuan (吳通玄), and all of them resented Lu Zhi. They therefore manufactured documents defaming Lu, to try to stop Emperor Dezong from trusting Lu. However, Emperor Dezong found out, and in summer 792 demoted Dou Shen, Li Zezhi, and Wu Tongxuan out of the capital, and soon ordered Wu to commit suicide. Soon thereafter, Emperor Dezong demoted Dou Shen to be the secretary general of Chen Prefecture (郴州, in modern Chenzhou, Hunan). Lu Zhi and Zhao Jing were named chancellors.

== After chancellorship and death ==
In 792, the former chancellor Jiang Gongfu, a former colleague of Lu Zhi's as an imperial scholar, met Lu to request his help in obtaining a promotion. Lu secretly responded:

I had heard that Chancellor Dou [(i.e., Dou Shen, who had recently been removed and exiled by Emperor Dezong)] had recommended you a number of times. The Emperor refused, and had a number of angry words about you.

In fear, Jiang offered to resign and asked to become a Taoist monk. When Emperor Dezong inquired as to the reason and found out that he was fearful, he did not dare to state that Lu had told him this information, and instead claimed that Dou told him the information. Angry that his words had been leaked, Emperor Dezong demoted Jiang to be the secretary general of Quan Prefecture (泉州, in modern Quanzhou, Fujian), and sent imperial eunuch messengers to Dou, in exile, to rebuke him.

Meanwhile, Dou Shen's superior, Li Sun (李巽) the governor of Hunan Circuit had been demoted when Dou was chancellor. In 793, Li submitted a report about how Dou had received a gift in silk from Liu Shining (劉士寧) the military governor of Xuanwu Circuit (宣武, headquartered in modern Kaifeng, Henan) and accused Dou of improper association with governors. Emperor Dezong wanted to execute Dou; Lu Zhi opposed on the grounds that this offense was not a death offense. Emperor Dezong therefore demoted Dou to be the military advisor to the prefect of the distant Huan Prefecture (驩州, in modern Nghệ An Province, Vietnam). His son Dou Jingbo (竇景伯) was exiled to Quan Prefecture (泉州, in modern Quanzhou, Fujian), while his daughter Dou Zhenru (竇真如), who was a Buddhist nun, was made a servant at Chen Prefecture. His assets were seized. However, Emperor Dezong's eunuchs deeply hated Dou and continued to attack him. Eventually, even as Dou was on the way to Huan Prefecture, Emperor Dezong issued an edict ordering him to commit suicide.

== Notes and references ==
- Old Book of Tang, vol. 136.
- New Book of Tang, vol. 145.
- Zizhi Tongjian, vols. 233, 234.
