= Emperor Dezong of Tang =

Emperor of Tang China from 779 to 805

Emperor Dezong of Tang 唐德宗
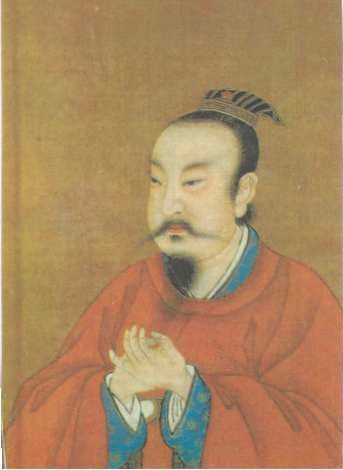

Emperor of the Tang dynasty
- Reign: June 12, 779 – February 25, 805
- Predecessor: Emperor Daizong
- Successor: Emperor Shunzong
- Born: May 27, 742
- Died: February 25, 805 (aged 62)
- Burial: Chong Mausoleum (崇陵)
- Consorts: Empress Zhaode (died 786)
Full name
- Family name: Lǐ (李); Given name: Kuò (适)
Era dates
- Jiànzhōng (建中) 780–783; Xīngyuán (興元) 784; Zhēnyuán (貞元) 785–805
Posthumous name
- Emperor Shenwu Xiaowen (神武孝文皇帝)
Temple name
- Dézōng (德宗)
- House: Li
- Dynasty: Tang
- Father: Emperor Daizong
- Mother: Empress Ruizhen

Tang Dezong
- Chinese: 唐德宗
- Literal meaning: "Virtuous Ancestor of the Tang"
Transcriptions
Standard Mandarin
- Hanyu Pinyin: Táng Dézōng

Li Kuo
- Chinese: 李适
- Literal meaning: (personal name)
Transcriptions
Standard Mandarin
- Hanyu Pinyin: Lǐ Kuò

Emperor Dezong of Tang (27 May 742 – 25 February 805), personal name Li Kuo, was the 12th emperor of the Chinese Tang dynasty. He was the oldest son of Emperor Daizong. His reign of 26 years was the third longest in the Tang dynasty. (Note: surpassed only by Emperor Xuanzong and Emperor Gaozong) Emperor Dezong started out as a diligent and frugal emperor and he tried to reform the governmental finances by introducing new tax laws. His attempts to destroy the powerful regional warlords and the subsequent mismanagement of those campaigns, however, resulted in a number of rebellions that nearly destroyed him and the Tang dynasty. After those events, he dealt cautiously with the regional governors, causing warlordism to become unchecked, and his trust of eunuchs caused the eunuchs' power to rise greatly. He was also known for his paranoia about officials' wielding power, and late in his reign, he did not grant much authority to his chancellors.

== Background ==
Li Kuo was born in 742, during the reign of his great-grandfather Emperor Xuanzong. His father was Li Chu the Prince of Guangping—the oldest son of Emperor Xuanzong's son and crown prince Li Heng, and he was Li Chu's oldest son. His mother was a consort of Li Chu's, Consort Shen. He was born at the eastern palace—i.e., the Crown Prince's palace—at the Tang capital Chang'an. Later that year, he was created the Prince of Fengjie and given the honorific title of Tejin (特進). During the Anshi Rebellion, which erupted in 755, Emperor Xuanzong fled to Chengdu, while Li Heng and his sons, including Li Chu, fled to Lingwu. Li Kuo's exact locations during this time were not stated in historical records, although presumably he accompanied his father, because while his mother Consort Shen was captured by the rebel Yan forces along with many palace women, he was not. (Note: Consort Shen disappeared during the rebellion. After the end of the rebellion, despite repeated efforts made by both Li Chu and Li Kuo to find her, she was never located.) While Li Heng was at Lingwu, he was declared emperor (as Emperor Suzong), an act that Emperor Xuanzong later recognized.

After Chang'an was recaptured from Yan forces in 756, Li Chu (Note: whose name was then changed to Li Yu) was made crown prince, and in 762, after Emperor Suzong's death, he became emperor (as Emperor Daizong). Emperor Daizong gave Li Kuo the title of supreme commander of the armed forces and created him the Prince of Lu, a title soon changed to Prince of Yong. He and his staff were sent to rendezvous with Tang and allied Huige forces at Shan Prefecture (陝州, in modern Sanmenxia, Henan), to prepare an attack to recapture the eastern capital Luoyang, which was then serving as the Yan capital under Yan's fourth and final emperor Shi Chaoyi. When Li Kuo met Huige's Dengli Khan Yaoluoge Yidijian (藥羅葛移地健), he treated Yaoluoge Yidijian as an equal, drawing Yaoluoge Yidijian's anger. (Note: Tang was highly reliant on Huige aid at the time.). Yaoluoge Yidijian had Li Kuo's Yao Ziang (藥子昂), Wei Ju (魏琚), Wei Shaohua (韋少華), and Li Jin (李進) arrested and whipped severely, such that Wei Ju and Wei Shaohua died that night. Yaoluoge Yidijian did not harm Li Kuo, but sent him back to the Tang camp. This incident would cause Li Kuo to bear great hatred for Huige later. After Luoyang was recaptured and Shi Chaoyi committed suicide in flight in 763, Li Kuo was given the chancellor title of Shangshu Ling (尚書令), and his portrait, along with those of eight generals (including Guo Ziyi), were added to the Portraits at Lingyan Pavilion. Subsequently, during a Tibet incursion in 763 in which Emperor Daizong was forced to flee Chang'an and Tibet forces briefly captured Chang'an, Li Kuo was named the titular supreme commander of forces in the Guanzhong region (i.e., the Chang'an region), but the general Guo Ziyi, as deputy supreme commander, was actually in command.

== As crown prince ==
In 764, Li Kuo was made crown prince. Emperor Daizong then tried to transfer his title of Shangshu Ling to Guo Ziyi, but Guo declined on the basis that only Li Kuo had held the title recently, and previously the title had been held by Emperor Taizong. Meanwhile, in 765, a Buddhist nun named Guangcheng (廣澄) claimed to be Li Kuo's mother Consort Shen, but after further interrogation, it was discovered that she had only been Li Kuo's wet nurse, and Emperor Daizong had her whipped to death.

Li Kuo's activities as crown prince were not much recorded in the official histories—although, in 778, after Emperor Daizong executed the corrupt chancellor Yuan Zai, he stated to his close associate Li Mi that it was Li Kuo who revealed Yuan's corruption. In 779, when Emperor Daizong fell ill, Li Kuo briefly served as regent, and when Emperor Daizong subsequently died, he succeeded Emperor Daizong (as Emperor Dezong).

== Early attempts to destroy warlord power (early Jianzhong era) ==
After Emperor Dezong took the throne, within the span of less than a year, he carried out several actions to set out his policy differences with his father:

- The chancellor Chang Gun, whom Emperor Dezong suspected of being overly powerful, was exiled, replaced with Cui Youfu; subsequently, at Cui's recommendation, Yang Yan was also made chancellor.
- Guo Ziyi, who had much military authority, was effectively forced into retirement (albeit with many honorific titles), with his commands divided between Li Huaiguang, Chang Qianguang (常謙光), and Hun Jian (渾瑊).
- Emperor Dezong had the animals in the imperial menagerie released, had many ladies in waiting sent out of the palace, and ordered that eunuchs serving as imperial messengers not be allowed to receive gifts.
- Cui Ning the military governor (Jiedushi) of Xichuan Circuit (西川, headquartered in modern Chengdu, Sichuan), who had governed the circuit for more than a decade and only nominally obeyed imperial authority, was detained (although titularly promoted) at Chang'an, and the imperial government took back control of Xichuan.
- At Yang's suggestion, the tax system was reformed—with the intention to decrease the tax burden on the landowners and farmers and bring merchants, who were previously not taxed, into the taxation system—under a new tax law known as the Law of the Two Taxes (兩稅法, Liangshui Fa).

Emperor Dezong further resumed the search for his mother Consort Shen, whom he honored as an empress dowager in absentia. He commissioned officials, as well as Shen clan members, to be in charge of the search, and gave many members of the Shen clan honors. In 781, the searchers mistakenly believed that an adoptive daughter of Gao Lishi, a powerful eunuch during Emperor Xuanzong's reign, was Empress Dowager Shen, and she was taken to Chang'an to be honored as such. However, her brother Gao Chengyue (高承悅) found out and reported to Emperor Dezong. She subsequently admitted to not being the real Empress Dowager Shen. Emperor Dezong did not punish her or anyone else involved, fearing that doing so would hamper the search for his mother. Later in his reign, there were several more incidents were others claimed to be Empress Dowager Shen, but were discovered to be imposters, and the real Empress Dowager Shen was never found.

Meanwhile, Emperor Dezong, under Yang's proposal, also began to consider campaigns to recapture the western prefectures lost to Tibet during and immediately after the Anshi Rebellion. However, his putting Li Huaiguang, known for being a harsh commander, in charge of the project caused a mutiny of the soldiers at Jingyuan Circuit (涇原, headquartered in modern Pingliang, Gansu) in 780. Emperor Dezong had the Jingyuan mutiny suppressed, to show resolve, but was forced to abandon the plans to act against Tibet.

=== Rebellion of Four Garrisons ===
When Emperor Dezong came to the throne, there were four major circuits that were ruled by their military governors in effectively independent manner from the imperial government—Pinglu (平盧, headquartered in modern Tai'an, Shandong), governed by Li Zhengji; Weibo (魏博, headquartered in modern Handan, Hebei), governed by Tian Yue; Chengde (成德, headquartered in modern Shijiazhuang, Hebei), governed by Li Baochen; and Shannan East (山南東道, headquartered in modern Xiangfan, Hubei), governed by Liang Chongyi. The four circuits were allied with each other, and their governors intended to pass the control of the circuits within the family. In 781, when Li Baochen died, Emperor Dezong, wanting to show imperial authority, refused to let his son Li Weiyue inherit the circuit. The four circuits thus prepared for war against the imperial government. (Li Zhengji also died later in the year, and similarly, Emperor Dezong refused to let his son Li Na inherit the circuit.)

Emperor Dezong reacted by commissioning Li Xilie the military governor of Huaixi Circuit (淮西, headquartered in modern Zhumadian, Henan) to command the army against Shannan East; Ma Sui, Li Baozhen, and Li Sheng to attack Weibo; and Zhu Tao the acting military governor of Lulong Circuit (盧龍, headquartered in modern Beijing) to attack Chengde. Ma, Li Baozhen, and Li Sheng quickly defeated Tian's forces, which were attacking Li Baozhen's Zhaoyi Circuit (昭義, headquartered in modern Changzhi, Shanxi) and forced him to flee back to his capital Wei Prefecture (魏州), which Ma, Li Baozhen, Li Sheng, and Li Qiu (李艽) put under siege. Li Xilie quickly defeated Liang, causing Liang to commit suicide. Zhu was able to persuade Li Weiyue's officer Zhang Xiaozhong to turn against him and attack Li Weiyue with Zhu, and under pressure, another officer of Li Weiyue's, Wang Wujun, killed Li Weiyue and surrendered to imperial forces. Li Na, meanwhile, was trapped at Pu Prefecture (濮州, in modern Heze, Shandong). By spring 782, it appeared that Emperor Dezong would be soon successful in his aim to wipe out warlord power and reunify the realm under imperial authority.

Things quickly turned for the worse, however, after Emperor Dezong angered both Zhu and Wang by not giving them what they believed they deserved—in Zhu's case, control of Chengde's Shen Prefecture (深州, in modern Hengshui, Hebei), and in Wang's case, title as military governor. (Emperor Dezong had divided Chengde's seven prefectures into three circuits, with Zhang receive three circuits as military governor, and with Wang and another Chengde officer, Kang Rizhi (康日知), each receiving two prefectures with the lesser title of military prefect (團練使, Tuanlianshi).) He also refused to accept Li Na's surrender when Li Na offered to surrender. As a result, Zhu and Wang entered into an alliance with Tian and headed south to lift the siege on Wei Prefecture—defeating Ma, Li Baozhen, and Li Huaiguang (whom Emperor Dezong had also sent to combat Tian) to force the situation into a stalemate, while Li Na escaped the trap imperial forces had put him in at Pu Prefecture and returned to his headquarters at Yun Prefecture (鄆州), leaving imperial forces unable to do much against him. The four rebel generals (Zhu, Wang, Tian, and Li Na) each claimed princely titles, showing a break from the Tang imperial government, although they continued to use Emperor Dezong's era name of Jianzhong to show some degree of submissiveness. They also persuaded Li Xilie to do the same.

By this point, Cui had died, and Lu Qi became chancellor along with Yang. Lu soon was able to persuade Emperor Dezong that Yang was intending treason, and Emperor Dezong put Yang to death. With Lu largely in power by himself, it was said that at his inducement, Emperor Dezong became unduly harsh, causing the officials and the people to be disappointed in Emperor Dezong. With the necessity of paying for campaigns on multiple fronts, Emperor Dezong added two new taxes—property taxes for houses (Shuijianjia, 稅間架) and transaction tax (Chumoqian, 除陌錢); these taxes created heavy burdens, and Emperor Dezong's tax code for these taxes further encouraged people to report on each other when the taxes were not paid properly. It was said that complaints about them filled the realm. The imperial scholar Lu Zhi, whose opinion Emperor Dezong valued, earnestly advised against these taxes and against the campaigns, pointing out that the realm was on the verge of completely falling into rebellion. Emperor Dezong, however, did not accept Lu's advice.

== Rebellions of Zhu Ci, Li Huaiguang, and Li Xilie ==
On November 2, 783, soldiers from Jingyuan Circuit, at Chang'an to be deployed to the battlefield to the east, rebelled when they became angry that they were not only not given rewards that they believed they deserved, but were being fed a vegetarian diet, mutinied. They attacked the palace, and Emperor Dezong fled with his family to Xianyang (咸陽, in modern Xianyang, Shaanxi), and then to Fengtian (奉天, in modern Xianyang). The soldiers supported Zhu Tao's brother Zhu Ci—who had previously been a major general and who had been the military governor of Jingyuan Circuit at one point but who was removed from his command due to Zhu Tao's rebellion—as their leader. Zhu Ci soon declared himself emperor of a new state of Qin. Many Tang officials surrendered to Zhu and served in his administration, although many fled to Fengtian to join Emperor Dezong.

Zhu Ci personally led an army and put Fengtian under siege for more than a month, and the small city nearly fell. Meanwhile, Li Huaiguang, hearing of what had happened at Chang'an, marched his army from Weibo as quickly as possible toward Fengtian. Zhu, hearing of Li's impending arrival, first attacked Fengtian even more severely but still could not capture it, and with Li arriving, Zhu withdrew back to Chang'an on December 18.

However, in the aftermaths of Li's saving him, Emperor Dezong offended Li by refusing to meet him, but instead ordering him to rendezvous with several other generals—Li Sheng (who had also marched toward Fengtian), Li Jianhui (李建徽), and Yang Huiyuan (楊惠元)—to recapture Chang'an. (This was at Lu Qi's suggestion, as Lu knew that Li Huaiguang despised him and, if he were allowed to meet the emperor, would surely accuse him and his associates Zhao Zan (趙贊) and Bai Zhizhen (白志貞) of crimes.) Li Huaiguang became disaffected, but submitted petitions demanding the dismissals of Lu and his associates. As a result, Lu, Bai, and Zhao were exiled.

At Lu Zhi's suggestion, on January 27, 784 (Chinese New Year) Emperor Dezong issued a pardon blaming himself for provoking the rebellions and pardoning all of the warlords and their soldiers, with the only exception of Zhu Ci personally, and further exempting the soldiers involved in the campaign against Zhu Ci from taxes. Upon receiving the pardons, Wang Wujun, Tian Yue, and Li Na renounced their princely titles and reclaimed allegiance to Tang; in turn, Emperor Dezong made them military governors of their own circuits. However, Li Xilie reacted by declaring himself the emperor of a new state of Chu, while Zhu Tao headed south, attempting to join Zhu Ci. When Tian refused to join him, he attacked Weibo, but was unable to immediately capture it. With Tian Yue subsequently assassinated and succeeded by his cousin Tian Xu, Zhu Tao initially attempted to persuade Tian Xu to join him, but Tian eventually reentered an alliance with Wang and Li Baozhen and resisted Zhu Tao. Wang and Li Baozhen soon arrived and defeated Zhu Tao, forcing him to flee back to Lulong.

Meanwhile, though, Li Huaiguang, disaffected from Emperor Dezong, was in secret negotiations with Zhu Ci (who had changed his state's name to Han by this point) to enter an alliance with Zhu. Zhu promised to honor Li Huaiguang as an elder brother and divide the Guanzhong region with him, with each ruling a state as its emperor. On March 20, Li Huaiguang declared his rebellion and alliance with Zhu. Emperor Dezong fled from Fengtian to Liang Prefecture (梁州, in modern Hanzhong, Shaanxi). Several key officers under Li Huaiguang—including Han Yougui (韓遊瓌), Dai Xiuyan (戴休顏), Luo Yuanguang (駱元光), and Shang Kegu (尚可孤)—however, refused to follow Li Huaiguang and instead accepted commands from Li Sheng, whom Emperor Dezong made the commander of Tang forces in the region. With Li Huaiguang weakened, Zhu no longer treated him with respect but instead as a subordinate. In anger and fear, Li Huaiguang withdrew from the region and headed back to his base at Hezhong (河中, in modern Yuncheng, Shaanxi).

Li Sheng soon prepared for a final attack on Chang'an, and he launched his attack on June 12. On June 20, with Li Sheng having entered the city, Zhu Ci fled toward Tibet. He was soon killed in flight by his own soldiers, ending his state of Han. On August 3, Emperor Dezong returned to Chang'an. When he sent emissaries to persuade Li Huaiguang to again pledge allegiance to him, Li Huaiguang was initially receptive, but when Emperor Dezong's further emissary, the official Kong Chaofu (孔巢父), arrived at Hezhong, Li Huaiguang's soldiers, believing that Kong was showing disrespect to Li Huaiguang, killed Kong, apparently with Li Huaiguang's implicit approval, and Li Huaiguang continued to resist Tang forces. By fall 785, however, with Tang forces under Ma Sui and Hun Jian converging on Hezhong, Li Huaiguang committed suicide, and his army resubmitted to Tang.

Meanwhile, Li Xilie's continued attempts to expand were being repeatedly rebuffed by Tang generals. In summer 786, with Li Xilie being ill, his general Chen Xianqi had him poisoned, slaughtered his family, and then resubmitted to Tang authority. (While Chen was soon thereafter himself assassinated by Wu Shaocheng, Wu continued to pledge allegiance to Tang.) Nominally, the realm was again entirely under Emperor Dezong's rule.

== Period of strong chancellors Li Mi and Lu Zhi (early Zhenyuan era) ==
However, by this point, the empire was in deep trouble due to the wars, and Tibet forces, taking advantage of Tang's weakening, were making repeated incursions into Tang territory. Tibet's chancellor Shang Jiezan (尚結贊), in particular, believed that he would be able to conquer Tang if he could get three Tang generals out of the way—Li Sheng, Ma Sui, and Hun Jian. With Emperor Dezong beginning to become paranoid about generals having too much power by this point, it was soon thereafter that rumors spread by Shang and Li's political enemy Zhang Yanshang, then a chancellor, made Emperor Dezong suspicious of Li Sheng, who was then the military governor of Fengxiang Circuit (鳳翔, in modern Baoji, Shaanxi). In 787, he recalled Li back to Chang'an to serve as chancellor as well, stripping him of his military command.

Meanwhile, Shang continued the next stage of his plan, by submitting a peace proposal through Ma. Emperor Dezong believed Shang's good faith and agreed to the treaty, despite Li's warnings. At Shang's request, Emperor Dezong sent Hun to meet with Shang and sign the treaty. On July 8, 787, the day set for the treaty signing, Shang ambushed Hun at the meeting site, intending to capture him, but Hun escaped with emergency aid from Luo Yuanguang and Han Yougui. As Ma was responsible for arranging the peace treaty with Shang, Emperor Dezong recalled him to Chang'an as well and stripped him of his command of Hedong Circuit (河東, in modern Taiyuan, Shanxi).

After the disaster, Emperor Dezong recalled Li Mi, who had been serving as the governor (觀察使, Guanchashi) of Shan'guo Circuit (陝虢, headquartered in modern Sanmenxia, Henan), to Chang'an to serve as chancellor, and soon thereafter, Li Mi effectively became sole chancellor. Under Li Mi's suggestion, Emperor Dezong instituted a regime where soldiers were encouraged to settle in the border region with Tibet and were promised land and seeds, to repopulate the border region and strengthen the defense. Li Mi also proposed a marriage alliance with Huige's Heguduolu Khan Yaoluoge Dunmohe (藥羅葛頓莫賀)—a proposal that Emperor Dezong initially resisted due to his hatred for Huige—but finally agreed to, with Li Sheng and Ma also agreeing with Li Mi's opinion. With Huige (which was soon renamed Huigu) fighting with Tibet, and with Tibet's major vassal Nanzhao distancing itself from Tibet's campaigns against Tang, Tibet attacks on Tang began to weaken, such that Tang generals were beginning to have successes against Tibet.

By this point, however, Emperor Dezong was also extracting frequent tributes from regional governors for his own personal use. Li Mi tried to curb the emperor's hoarding of treasure by instituting an annual stipend for the emperor, which Emperor Dezong initially agreed to. However, even after the stipend was instituted, Emperor Dezong continued to demand tributes from regional governors and ordered that they not let Li Mi become aware of the tributes. When Li Mi still found out, he became depressed over this issue but did not dare to speak again about it.

Li Mi died in 789, and for some time, Li Mi's recommended successor, Dou Can, was the most powerful chancellor at court, but he soon lost Emperor Dezong's favor and was exiled (and eventually ordered to commit suicide). Lu Zhi became the main chancellor, and for some time, made ambitious proposals to reform the civil service system and logistics system, and reassert authority over regional governors—whom, by this point, Emperor Dezong was so apprehensive about such that he was not daring to impose governors unless he had explicit agreements from the key military officers of the circuits. (For example, after the death of Liu Xuanzuo (劉玄佐) the military governor of Xuanwu Circuit (宣武, headquartered in modern Kaifeng, Henan) in 792, Emperor Dezong was initially intending to commission his granduncle Wu Cou (吳湊) to replace Liu, but after Xuanwu soldiers mutinied and supported Liu Xuanzuo's son Liu Shining (劉士寧), Emperor Dezong did not dare to confront the Xuanwu army and instead agreed to commission Liu Shining.) Lu, however, was soon in conflict with Emperor Dezong's favorite official Pei Yanling—who was able to garner Emperor Dezong's favor by making Emperor Dezong believe that he was locating long-lost revenue resources for the imperial treasury. By 794, Lu had lost the power struggle with Pei and lost his chancellorship, and in 795 was exiled.

== Middle Zhenyuan era ==
It was said that after Lu Zhi's removal, Emperor Dezong became increasingly distrusting of chancellors. He therefore personally selected all of the officials, but as he could not have actually known all of the candidates for official positions himself, he trusted the recommendations of Pei Yanling (who died in 796) and such other officials that he trusted, including Li Qiyun (李齊運), Wang Shao (王紹), Li Shi (李實), Wei Zhiyi, and Wei Qumou (韋渠牟). It was described that these people's recommendations could ruin chancellors, and that those who wanted to be promoted flattered them.

Emperor Dezong also increasingly open to tributes from regional governors, and the regional governors often submitted large amounts of tributes in order to protect their positions and gain favor from the emperor.

Also around this time, powerful eunuchs (starting with Dou Wenchang (竇文場) and Huo Xianming (霍仙鳴)) became the commanders of the Shence Army, and it was said that, as the military governors frequently were Shence Army soldiers initially, the power and authorities of the eunuchs became increasingly important.

In 799, for reasons lost to history, Wu Shaocheng, still governing Zhangyi Circuit (formerly Huaixi Circuit) at that time, began to pillage the circuits around his. Emperor Dezong ordered the military governors around Zhangyi—including Yu Di the military governor of Shannan East Circuit, Han Hong (Liu Xuanzuo's nephew) the military governor of Xuanwu Circuit, Yi Shen (伊慎) the military governor of Anhuang Circuit (安黃, headquartered in modern Xiaogan, Hubei), and Shangguan Shui (上官涗) the military governor of Chenxu Circuit (陳許, headquartered in modern Xuchang, Henan)—to attack Wu. These generals had initial successes, but without an unified command, they could not coordinate their actions, and around the new year 800, they suddenly collapsed and fled, allowing Wu to capture much of their supplies. Emperor Dezong put Han Quanyi (韓全義) the military governor of Xiasui Circuit (夏綏, headquartered in modern Yulin, Shaanxi) in command of the operations, but Han Quanyi was repeatedly defeated by Wu. At the suggestion of Wei Gao the military governor of Xichuan Circuit and the chancellor Jia Dan, Emperor Dezong pardoned Wu in late 800, ending the campaign.

== Late Zhenyuan era ==
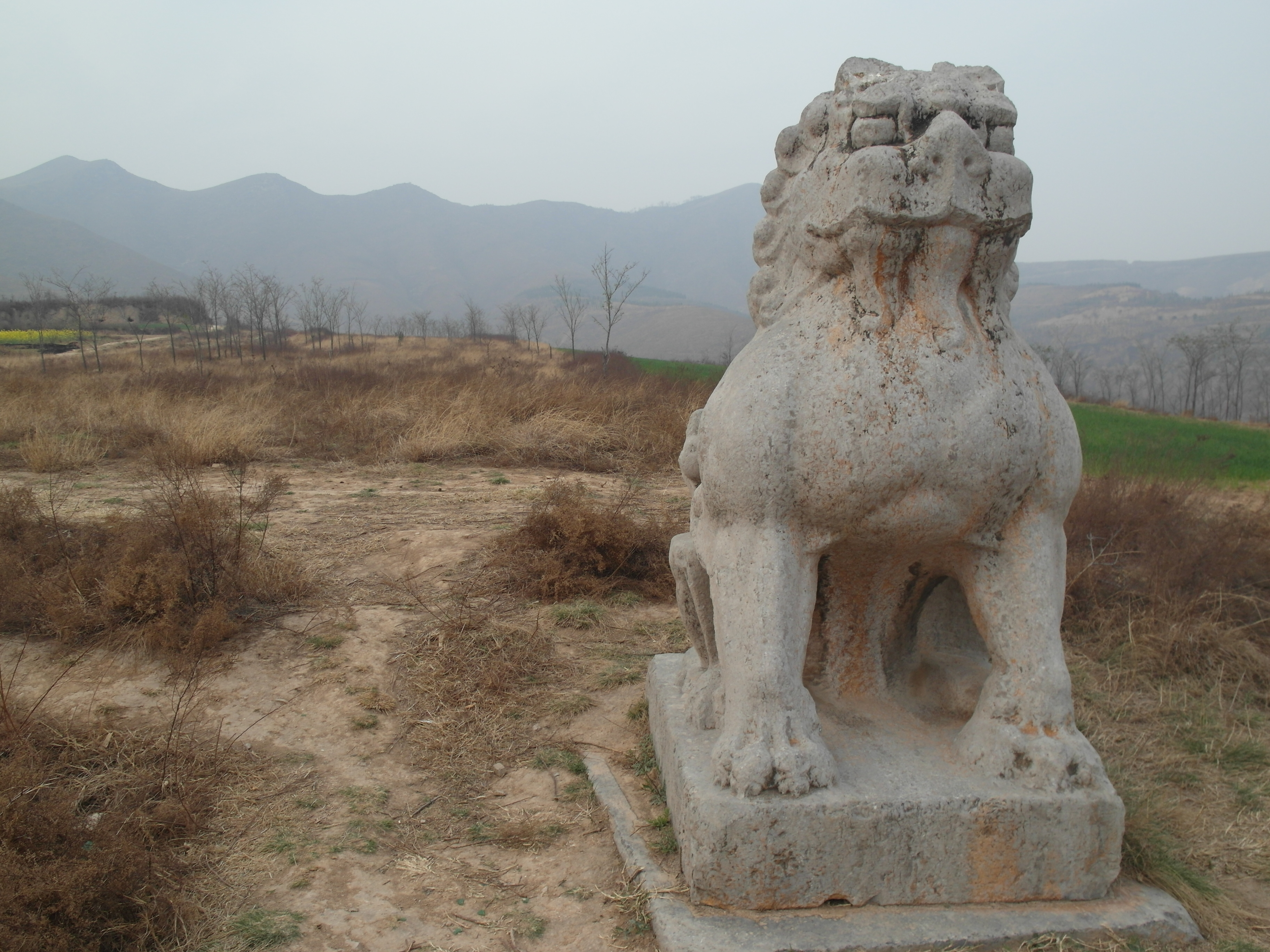
Chongling (崇陵), tomb of Emperor Dezong, in Jingyang County, Shaanxi

Meanwhile, due to victories that Wei Gao and the Nanzhao king Yimouxun (異牟尋), who had rejoined the tributary system of China after the battle of Shenchuan, were inflicting on Tibet. Tibet had become a much lesser threat to Tang security by this point.

By this time, Emperor Dezong's oldest son Li Song the Crown Prince had become close to the junior officials Wang Pi and Wang Shuwen, and Wang Pi and Wang Shuwen and their associates were planning To carry out a number of reforms when Li Song would eventually be emperor. The officials who associated with them included Wei Zhiyi and such junior officials as Lu Chun (陸淳), Lü Wen (呂溫), Li Jingjian (李景儉), Han Ye (韓曄), Han Tai (韓泰), Chen Jian (陳諫), Liu Zongyuan, and Liu Yuxi. They essentially formed a shadow government.

In winter 804, however, Li Song suddenly suffered a stroke, causing him to be partially paralyzed and unable to speak. In spring 805, it was said that because of Li Song's illness, Emperor Dezong himself became severely depressed and fell into an illness. He died on February 25, 805, and, while there was some speculation both inside the palace and out as to whether Li Song would actually take the throne due to his severe illness, Li Song did so (as Emperor Shunzong).

== Issues during Emperor Dezong's reign ==
Dezong's reign can be summarized into three categories of mismanagements that began during his reign and would have repercussions for future Tang emperors.

=== Attempts at eliminating military governors ===
The early part of Dezong's reign can be seen as an attempt to limit the strength of the fanzhen, a situation where regional military governors or jiedushi had sprung up after the An Lushan rebellion, to take control of huge border areas of the empire. These fiefs were a direct challenge to the central administration of the Tang empire as they were granted the power to collect tax, maintain an army and pass on their power hereditarily rather by appointment of the central government. As such these warlords would only be loyal to central government if it served their interest to do so. In early 781, when one of the military governors, Li Baochen, died, out of respect for protocol, Li's son, Li Weiyue requested to the central government that he be appointed the succeeding governor. Dezong seized upon this request as a chance to rid his state of the military governors and declined to grant Li Weiyue the title. This act angered the rest of the military governors who saw Dezong as a threat. In 782, the four strongest military governors banded together and revolted against the central government. In the meantime, an internal military coup albeit a minor one forced Dezong to flee his palace in capital city of Chang'an – the third Tang emperor to do so. As a result, all plans to remove the military governors had to be abandoned. In early 784, in order to restore peace and stability, Dezong decreed that he would not limit their power and accept responsibility for causing the initial revolt. Dezong's humiliating acceptance of defeat was just as toxic to Dezong himself as to the dynasty. Dezong became disenchanted with ever achieving his goals and when he thought it was unattainable, he would not pursue. Dezong's inability to control the fanzhen weakened the centralized power of the Tang dynasty and would contribute to a series of rebellions in the middle of the 9th century and ultimately lead to its downfall early in the 10th century.

=== Dependence on eunuchs ===
Dezong witnessed the rise of eunuchs during the reign of his father Emperor Daizong who himself succeeded to the throne as a result of support from eunuchs. Dezong realized the danger of depending too heavily on eunuchs and as a result he kept them at arm's length when he became emperor. Dezong's opinion of these eunuchs changed drastically when in 782 Dezong was driven out of his capital city by revolting military governors and was not able to command the situation. Even his own generals would not heed to his authority. Dezong felt forsaken and during his escape, only a handful of eunuchs namely Dou Wenchang and Huo Xianming were by his side. During this difficult times, Dezong's view of the eunuchs began to take on a different approach. After his return to Chang'an, Dezong greatly rewarded Dou and Huo for their loyalty not least of which were military and government post. In due course, these eunuchs' power became an inalienable part of the Tang government. Some eunuchs in the latter part of the dynasty were so powerful that they alone held the abilities to support or depose any emperors at whim. Dezong's son Tang Shunzong and grandson Tang Xianzong as well as later emperors such as Tang Jingzong and Tang Wenzong were all murdered or deposed by eunuchs.

=== From frugality to greed ===
Dezong began his reign by issuing a variety of edicts restricting wasteful government spending. Monetary contribution from local government officials or abroad were discouraged or limited. He also issued edicts that freed hundreds of palace girls in order to reduce palace expenses. These acts were all met with praise however they only lasted the first few years of his reign. A series of unfortunate events which included revolts by military governors forced Dezong to flee Chang'an in 784. During the months in exile, Dezong began to realize the importance of creating wealth and as a result, after Dezong's returned to Chang'an he began to reverse many of the original edicts he set forth. With the aid of eunuchs, Dezong started to amalgamate a large fortune either by extortion or bribery. These in turn led to a negative atmosphere where wealth rather than merit would ultimately bring one power.

== Chancellors during reign ==
- Chang Gun (779)
- Li Zhongchen (779–784 (Note: Li Zhongchen joined Zhu Ci's state of Qin in 783 and served as a chancellor for Qin, but the table of chancellors in the New Book of Tang continued to regard Li Zhongchen as a chancellor until he was captured and executed by Tang forces in 784. See New Book of Tang, vol. 62.))
- Cui Youfu (779–780)
- Qiao Lin (779)
- Yang Yan (779–781)
- Lu Qi (781–783)
- Zhang Yi (781–782)
- Guan Bo (782–784)
- Xiao Fu (783–784)
- Liu Congyi (783–785)
- Jiang Gongfu (783–784)
- Li Huaiguang (783–784)
- Lu Han (784–786)
- Li Sheng (784–793)
- Hun Jian (784–799)
- Li Mian (784–786)
- Zhang Yanshang (785, 787)
- Ma Sui (785–795)
- Liu Zi (786–787)
- Cui Zao (786)
- Qi Ying (786–787)
- Han Huang (786–787) (Note: Han Huang was not listed in the table of chancellors, perhaps because he was still then military governor (Jiedushi) of Zhenhai Circuit (鎮海, headquartered in modern Zhenjiang, Jiangsu) and therefore arguably only an honorary chancellor, but he was listed in the table of chancellors' family trees, in the New Book of Tang. Compare New Book of Tang, vol. 62, with New Book of Tang, vol. 73.1.)
- Liu Hun (787)
- Li Mi (787–789)
- Dou Can (789–792)
- Dong Jin (789–793)
- Zhao Jing (792–796)
- Lu Zhi (792–794)
- Jia Dan (793–805)
- Lu Mai (793–797)
- Cui Sun (796–803)
- Zhao Zongru (796–798)
- Zheng Yuqing (798–800)
- Qi Kang (800–803)
- Du You (803–812)
- Gao Ying (803–805)
- Zheng Xunyu (803–805)

== Family ==
- Empress Zhaode, of the Wang clan (昭德皇后 王氏; d. 786)
  - Li Song, Shunzong (順宗 李誦/顺宗 李诵; 761–806), 1st son
  - Princess Zhenmu of Han (韓貞穆公主／韦贞穆公主; 762–784), 1st daughter
    - Married Wei You (韋宥／韦宥), and had issue (one daughter)
- Gracious Consort, of the Zhao clan (赵惠妃, 768 – 804)
- Worthy Consort, of the Wei clan (賢妃 韋氏/贤妃 韦氏, d. 809)
- Consort Wang, of the Wang clan (王妃 王氏)
- Zhaoyi, of the Wang clan (昭仪 王氏)
- Chongrong, of the Wu clan (充容 武氏)
- Unknown
  - Li Chen, Prince Tong (通王 李諶／李谌; 771–798), third son
  - Li Liang, Prince Qian (虔王 李諒／李谅), fourth son
  - Li Xiang, Prince Su (肅王 李詳／肃王 李详; 779–782), fifth son
  - Li Qian, Prince Zi (資王 李謙／资王 李谦; b. 779), sixth son
  - Li Yin, Prince Dai (代王 李諲／李𬤇; 779), seventh son
  - Li Jie, Prince Zhao (照王 李誡／李诫), ninth son
  - Li E, Prince Qin (欽王 李諤／钦王 李谔), tenth son
  - Li Xian, Prince Zhen (珍王 李諴／李咸; 801–833), 11th son
  - Princess Weixianmu (魏宪穆公主), 2nd daughter
    - Married Wang Shiping (王士平), a son of Wang Wujun, in 786
  - Princess Zhengzhuangmu (鄭莊穆公主／郑庄穆公主; d. 799), 3rd daughter
    - Married Zhang Maozong (張茂宗), a son of Zhang Xiaozhong, in 787
  - Princess Linzhen (臨真公主／临真公主)
    - Married Xue Zhao of Hedong (河東 薛釗／河东 薛钊)
  - Princess Yongyang (永陽公主／永阳公主), tenth daughter
    - Married Cui Yin of Qinghe (清河 崔𬤇)
  - Princess Puning (普寧公主／普宁公主), 11th daughter
  - Princess Yanxiangmu (燕襄穆公主; d. 808)
    - Married Tun Bagha Tarkhan (長壽天親可汗／长寿天亲可汗; d. 789) in 788
  - Princess Yichuan (義川公主／义川公主)
  - Princess Yidu (宜都公主; 772–803), fourth daughter
    - Married Liu Yu of Hedong (河东 柳昱; 760–804) in 796
  - Princess Jinping (晉平公主／晋平公主)

== Religious views ==
Dezong was one of a number of Tang dynasty emperors who gave money to monks and churches part of the Chinese Church of the East tradition. He believed in various ideas from Church of the East Christianity and Buddhism about the afterlife and Tian.

== See also ==
1. Chinese emperors family tree (middle)

== Notes ==
Regnal titles
Preceded by Emperor Daizong of Tang	Emperor of the Tang dynasty 779–805	Succeeded by Emperor Shunzong of Tang
