= Empress Wang (Dezong) =

Empress of Tang China in 786

Empress Wang (王皇后, personal name unknown) (died December 6, 786), formally Empress Zhaode (昭德皇后, "the accomplished and virtuous empress"), was an empress of the Chinese Tang dynasty for three days before her death. She was the wife of Emperor Dezong (Li Kuo) and the mother of Emperor Shunzong (Li Song).

== Background ==
Not much is known about the future Empress Wang's family, other than that her father Wang Yu (王遇) had once served as the director of the archival bureau (秘書監, MIshu Jian). She had at least one brother, Wang Guo (王果).

== As princely and imperial consort ==
The future Empress Wang became a consort, but not wife, to Li Kuo while he was the Prince of Fengjie under his great-grandfather Emperor Xuanzong or grandfather Emperor Suzong. She gave birth to his oldest son, Li Song in 761 and thereafter was particularly favored. After Li Kuo became emperor in 779 (as Emperor Dezong), she was created Shufei (淑妃), the second highest rank for imperial consorts under empress. He awarded her father Wang Yu posthumous honors while making her brother Wang Guo a prefectural military advisor. He also gave some 20 of her family members official positions. When he was briefly forced to flee the capital Chang'an in 783 during the midst of a mutiny at Chang'an by soldiers from Jingyuan Circuit (涇原, headquartered in modern Pingliang, Gansu), she might have carried the imperial seal with her for him as they fled to Fengtian (奉天, in modern Xianyang, Shaanxi).

== Creation as empress and death ==
Consort Wang grew ill in 786 and, on December 3, Emperor Dezong made her empress. She died three days later, on December 6. She was initially buried at a tomb separate from what would eventually become Emperor Dezong's tomb, but after his death in 805, she was moved to his tomb. She would become the last living Tang empress for over a century, until Empress He, the empress of Emperor Zhaozong, near the end of the dynasty (although several emperors' mothers would be honored as empresses dowager while they were living and posthumously honored as empresses after their deaths).

== Notes and references ==
- Old Book of Tang, vol. 52.
- New Book of Tang, vol. 77.
- Zizhi Tongjian, vol. 232.

Chinese royalty
Preceded by Empress Zhang	Empress of China (Guanzhong region); 786	Succeeded by Empress Cao of Qi
Preceded by Empress Zhang	Empress of the Tang dynasty 786	Succeeded by Empress He
Preceded by Empress Zhang	Empress of China (most regions); 786	Succeeded by Empress He
Preceded by Empress Xin of Yan	Empress of China (Northern/Central); 786	Succeeded by Empress He
