= Lu Zhi (Tang dynasty) =

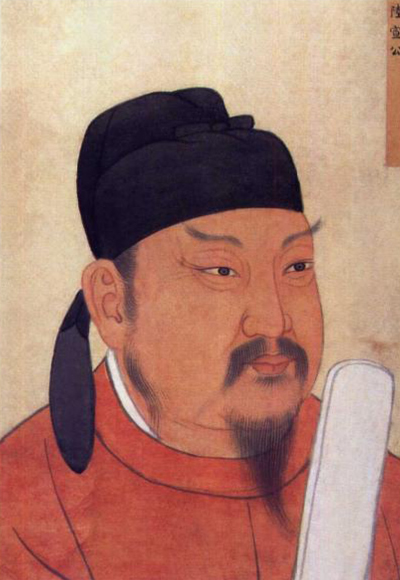
Portrait of Lu Zhi

Lu Zhi (Chinese: 陸贄; 754–805), courtesy name Jingyu (敬輿), posthumous name Xuan (宣), was a politician of China's Tang dynasty. He served as a personal advisor and later chancellor to Emperor Dezong.

Lu Zhi enjoyed the Emperor Dezong's confidence as a palace academician and imperial confidant, but as chancellor offended Emperor Dezong by repeatedly accusing the high official Pei Yanling of misconduct, and was demoted and died in exile. He left a relatively large body of writing on his advice to Emperor Dezong, which discussed in fair detail the condition of the Tang people at the time and thus is considered valuable, by historians such as Bo Yang, in contributing to historians' understanding of mid-Tang life.

== Background ==
Lu Zhi was born in 754, during the reign of Emperor Xuanzong. His family was from Su Prefecture (蘇州, in modern Suzhou, Jiangsu) and claimed ancestry from the royal house of the Warring States period state Qi, through officials of Han dynasty, Eastern Wu, Jin dynasty (266–420), Southern Qi, Liang dynasty, and Chen dynasty – although the family did not record the family line completely. Lu Zhi's biography in the Old Book of Tang gave his father's name as Lu Kan (陸侃) and indicated that Lu Kan had served as a county magistrate, while his biography in the New Book of Tang gave no name for his father, while indicating, in its table of chancellors' family trees, that his grandfather was named Lu Qiwang (陸齊望) and served as the director of the archival bureau, while his father's name was Lu Ba (陸灞) and served as a low-level official at the ministry of civil service affairs.

It was said that Lu Zhi lost his father early, and that he did not associate much with others. He was studious in his studies of Confucianism. When he was 17 (presumably 771, when Emperor Xuanzong's grandson Emperor Daizong was emperor), Lu passed the imperial examinations based on his knowledge and use of language, and was made the sheriff of Zheng County (鄭縣, in modern Weinan, Shaanxi). After his term of service was over, he was returning home to visit his mother, when he went through Shou Prefecture (壽州, in modern Lu'an, Anhui). The prefect of Shou Prefecture at the time was Zhang Yi (who would eventually be chancellor), and while Lu did not know Zhang, he went to visit Zhang to pay respect, because Zhang was well known at the time. Zhang kept Lu at his mansion for three days and got to know him. He was impressed by Lu and asked for them to be considered friends, despite the difference in their age. When Lu was set to continue his journey, Zhang wanted to give him a large amount of money as a gift to his mother, but Lu declined, accepting only a gift of tea. Later, Lu was recalled to serve as a secretary at Weinan County (渭南, in modern Weinan), and later was made an imperial censor with the title Jiancha Yushi (監察御史).

== Service under Emperor Dezong prior to chancellorship ==
=== Before Zhu Ci's rebellion ===
Meanwhile, Lu Zhi's abilities had drawn the attention of Emperor Daizong's crown prince Li Kuo. After Emperor Daizong died in 779 and Li Kuo ascended to the throne (as Emperor Dezong), he made Lu an imperial scholar (翰林學士, Hanlin Xueshi) and later Cibu Yuanwailang (祠部員外郎), a low-level official at the ministry of rites (禮部, Lǐbu); he also often sought advice from Lu. It was said that Lu had a faithful character, and, thankful that Emperor Dezong valued him for his advice, wanted to repay Emperor Dezong by providing detailed and honest advice; in turn, Emperor Dezong came to trust his advice greatly.

As of fall 783, with Emperor Dezong intending to reimpose imperial authority over a number of circuits which their military governors (Jiedushi) had long ruled in a de facto independent manner, imperial forces were locked into campaigns against several circuits in the Yellow River region – Pinglu (平盧, headquartered in modern Tai'an, Shandong, then ruled by Li Na; Lulong (盧龍, headquartered in modern Beijing), then ruled by Zhu Tao; Weibo (魏博, headquartered in modern Handan, Hebei), then ruled by Tian Yue; and Hengji (恆冀, headquartered in modern Shijiazhuang, Hebei, then ruled by Wang Wujun – as well as Huaixi (淮西, headquartered in modern Zhumadian, Henan), then ruled by Li Xilie. Lu submitted a petition to Emperor Dezong, pointing out that imperial forces were stretched thin, and the imperial treasury was being drained dangerously, causing Emperor Dezong's officials to increase tax levies and causing resentment from the people. He suggested that the most important project should be political reform, not military action, and that he should terminate the campaigns. Emperor Dezong did not accept his suggestions.

=== During Zhu Ci's rebellion ===
On November 2, 783, soldiers from Jingyuan Circuit (涇原, headquartered in modern Pingliang, Gansu), at the capital Chang'an to await deployment to the wars in the east, were angry that they did not receive rewards they felt they deserved, and they mutinied, forcing Emperor Dezong to flee to Fengtian (奉天, in modern Xianyang, Shaanxi). Lu initially was unable to catch up with Emperor Dezong, but eventually did. Lu Zhi blamed the disaster on a number of high level officials, particularly the chancellor Lu Qi, whom Emperor Dezong greatly trusted, and when Emperor Dezong, wanting to deflect the criticism against Lu Qi, blamed the disaster on ill fortune instead, Lu Zhi submitted a lengthy statement as to how blaming ill fortune was dangerous for an emperor. Lu Zhi also advocated greater communication between Emperor Dezong and the officials, as a way to avoid having certain officials hiding the truth from the emperor.

Meanwhile, the Jingyuan soldiers supported Zhu Tao's brother Zhu Ci, himself an important general until Emperor Dezong removed him from his command due to Zhu Tao's rebellion, as their leader, and Zhu Ci soon declared himself the emperor of a new state of Qin. He put Fengtian under siege, but due to the efforts of the Tang general Li Huaiguang, Fengtian was saved, and Zhu Ci was forced to withdraw back to Chang'an. After the siege was lifted, two of the first promotions announced by Emperor Dezong went to Lu Zhi and his fellow imperial scholar Wu Tongwei (吳通微) (in Lu's case, to be Kaozhong Langzhong (考功郎中), a supervisorial official at the ministry of civil service affairs (吏部, Lìbu, note different tone than the ministry of rites). Lu declined on the basis that the officials who were most directly reporting to the emperor (as the imperial scholars were) should not be the ones receiving promotions first; rather, the promotions should go to the soldiers and military officers first. Emperor Dezong did not accept his refusal.

While at Fengtian, Emperor Dezong sent messengers to try to get Wang Wujun, Tian Yue, and Li Na to resubmit to him. He was also planning on issuing a general pardon to help assure them, as well as their followers, that there would be no reprisals. He entrusted the drafting of the edict to Lu for wording that would touch the hearts of others. In spring 784, with Lu drafting the edict, Emperor Dezong issued a general pardon in which the emperor himself took the blame for the wars, offering to pardon all involved in resisting him except Zhu Ci. It was said that the wording was effective in causing the generals to turn their hearts, and soon thereafter, Wang, Tian, and Li Na, all of whom had declared themselves princes, shed their princely titles and resubmitted to Tang rule.

While this was happening, however, Li Huaiguang, angry that Emperor Dezong had apparently distrusted him due to his severe criticism against Lu Qi (whom Emperor Dezong was forced to exile due to Li Huaiguang's demands), was plotting for rebellion himself, and he began to absorb the forces of other imperial generals in order to strengthen himself in preparation. Lu Zhi, seeing this, advocated peeling the armies that had been under other imperial generals away from Li Huaiguang generally, and it was said that it was due to Lu Zhi's advocacy that Li Sheng's army avoided being absorbed by Li Huaiguang. However, Emperor Dezong did not follow Lu's suggestion on also peeling the armies of Li Jianhui (李建徽) and Yang Huiyuan (楊惠元) away from Li Huaiguang's, and when Li Huaiguang rebelled soon thereafter, he seized Li Jianhui's and Yang's as well. As a result of Li Huaiguang's rebellion, Emperor Dezong was further forced to flee to Liang Prefecture (梁州, in modern Hanzhong, Shaanxi). During the flight to Liang Prefecture, Emperor Dezong became separated from Lu, and it was said that he panicked so much that he cried in fear, offering a great reward for someone who can locate Lu, and when Lu later met up with him, he was very pleased. However, it was also said that because Lu was so blunt in his suggestions, the suspicious Emperor Dezong was also offended by him; therefore, such officials as Liu Congyi and Lu's imperial scholar colleague Jiang Gongfu were named chancellors at the time, while Lu, whose opinions Emperor Dezong valued, was not named chancellor. While at Liang Prefecture, it was at Lu's suggestion that Emperor Dezong did not act against the general Li Chulin (李楚琳), who had previously been a rebel (under the reasoning that if Emperor Dezong did so, Li Chulin might rebel again and endanger imperial forces), but when Jiang was demoted for speaking against Emperor Dezong's building a pagoda for his deceased daughter Princess Tang'an, Lu's attempt to intercede for Jiang was ineffective in preventing Jiang from being demoted. Lu also greatly advocated against a proposed alliance with Tufan on account that Tufan had treacherously attacked Tang on many occasions in the past, and when Tufan forces withdrew from the field after first promising to attack Zhu Ci (who had renamed his state Han) together, Lu, instead of showing distress, wrote a congratulatory submission to Emperor Dezong.

=== After Zhu Ci's rebellion ===
After Li Sheng recaptured Chang'an in summer 784 and Zhu Ci was killed in flight, Emperor Dezong returned to Chang'an, and Lu Zhi followed him. (On the way back to Chang'an, Emperor Dezong again considered replacing Li Chulin, but again per Lu's opinion did not do so.) Upon arrival in Chang'an, Emperor Dezong promoted Lu to be Zhongshu Sheren (中書舍人), a mid-level official at the legislative bureau of government (中書省), but continued to have him serve as an imperial scholar. In 785, after Li Huaiguang, who had occupied Hezhong Circuit (河中, headquartered in modern Yuncheng, Shanxi), suffered repeated defeats at the hands of the Tang generals Ma Sui and Hun Jian, committed suicide, Lu suggested to Emperor Dezong that the next thing to do is to reassure the former rebel generals (who had all resubmitted to Tang by this point except for Li Xilie, who had claimed the title of emperor of Chu) that he did not intend reprisals, and Emperor Dezong issued an edict to that effect.

Meanwhile, Emperor Dezong sent messengers to welcome Lu's mother Lady Wei to Chang'an, and treated her with great honors. Later, after Lady Wei died, Lu left governmental service and observed a period of mourning for her at the eastern capital Luoyang, staying at Fengle Temple (豐樂寺) at Mount Song. He refused all gifts sent to him in Lady Wei's honor, except for those from Wei Gao, the military governor of Xichuan Circuit (西川, headquartered in modern Chengdu), because Wei Gao was an old friend. Because it was customary for husband and wife to be buried together, Emperor Dezong also had Lu's father disinterred and his casket escorted to Luoyang, to be buried with Lady Wei. After Lu's mourning period was over, he was recalled to the government to again serve as imperial scholar and also acting deputy minister of defense (兵部侍郎, Bingbu Shilang). He met with Emperor Dezong to thank the emperor, and was said to be so touched that he was prostrate on the ground, crying; Emperor Dezong was also touched by his display of emotions. It was said that the people at the time had great expectations that he would be chancellor, but the main chancellor at that time, Dou Can, was apprehensive of Lu. In 791, due to Dou's instigation, then, while Lu was officially made deputy minister of defense, he was stripped of his imperial scholar status.

Meanwhile, Dou gained a reputation for treachery, and he began to lose Emperor Dezong's favor. In 792, Dou Can's nephew Dou Shen (竇申), fearful that Lu would be further promoted by Emperor Dezong, forged some documents defamatory to Lu with his maternal uncle Li Zezhi (李則之) the Prince of Guo and his ally, the imperial scholar Wu Tongxuan (吳通玄). Emperor Dezong found out about this and exiled Dou Shen, Li Zezhi, and Wu, and soon ordered Wu to commit suicide. Soon thereafter, Dou Can himself was exiled to be the secretary general at Chen Prefecture (郴州, in modern Chenzhou, Hunan), and Lu and Zhao Jing were named chancellors, with the designation Tong Zhongshu Menxia Pingzhangshi (同中書門下平章事); both of them also given the office of Zhongshu Shilang (中書侍郎) as the deputy heads of the legislative bureau.

== As chancellor ==
Soon after becoming chancellor, Lu Zhi advocated a system where the various supervising officials be allowed and required to recommend some capable subordinates for promotion. Emperor Dezong initially agreed, but after some time, believing reports that the officials were not recommending the right individuals, he wanted to end the system and return to the old system where the chancellors would select the officials for promotion. Lu opposed this reversion, pointing out that chancellors were formerly supervisorial officials and that it was not logical to believe that being given chancellor posts suddenly qualified them to select officials. Emperor Dezong, however, reverted to the old method anyway. Soon thereafter, when the military governor of Lingnan Circuit (嶺南, headquartered in modern Guangzhou, Guangdong) was complaining about the foreign merchants moving their businesses to Annan Circuit (安南, headquartered in modern Hanoi, Vietnam) and taking the substantial tax revenue away from Lingnan, Emperor Dezong considered agreeing with Lingnan's complaint and investigating the matter. Lu opposed this investigation, pointing out that both Lingnan and Annan were parts of the empire and that it must be that the Lingnan officials offended the foreign merchants by improperly exercising legal authority. It is not known whether Emperor Dezong agreed with Lu.

Also in 792, after the director of finances, Ban Hong (班宏) died, Lu recommended Li Sun (李巽) to succeed Ban. Emperor Dezong initially agreed, but soon wanted to make Pei Yanling Ban's successor instead. Lu vehemently objected, arguing that Pei was frivolous and treacherous, but his arguments were to no avail, as Emperor Dezong soon made Pei the director of finances. Later in the year, when reports of a great flood that affected the regions between the Yellow River and the Yangtze River – some 40 prefectures – Emperor Dezong, initially believing that the reports were probably exaggerated, did not want to send special emissaries to comfort the people and to distribute aid, but at Lu's suggestion did so. He, however, wanted to omit Huaixi Circuit (which was then governed by Li Xilie's old subordinate Wu Shaocheng) from the emissaries' itineraries because Huaixi was not submitting tax revenues to the imperial treasury; Lu pointed out that even if Huaixi were inimical to the emperor that it should nevertheless receive aid, and Emperor Dezong agreed.

Also in 792, Lu submitted a lengthy submission pointing out that the then-existing method for supplying food to the soldiers on the northern and western borders – shipping food from the Yangtze and Huai River region to supply then – was no longer making sense since, due to the flooding, the food prices in the Yangtze and Huai regions were much higher than the food prices in the northwest. He suggested that, instead, the government purchase local food in the northwest and use it to supply the army. Emperor Dezong agreed. Lu also pointed out that at the time, the military command system, where every single army reported directly to the emperor, was highly inefficient, and a command structure that gave more authority to the generals needed to be imposed. It is not known how Emperor Dezong reacted to his proposal.

Meanwhile, Jiang Gongfu, who had long served as a member of the crown prince Li Song's staff, with few actual authorities, met Lu to ask for his help. Lu secretly responded:

I had heard that Chancellor Dou [(i.e., Dou Can)] had recommended you a number of times. The Emperor refused, and had a number of angry words about you.

In fear, Jiang offered to resign and asked to become a Taoist monk. When Emperor Dezong inquired as to the reason and found out that he was fearful, he did not dare to state that Lu had told him this information, and instead claimed that Dou told him the information. Angry that his words had been leaked, Emperor Dezong demoted Jiang to be the secretary general of Quan Prefecture (泉州, in modern Quanzhou, Fujian), and sent imperial eunuch messengers to Dou, in exile, to rebuke him.

In 793, Emperor Dezong sent eunuch messengers to Lu, secretly instructing him on several matters: that as for important matters, he should directly submit proposals to Emperor Dezong without first consulting Zhao; that he had heard reports that Miao Can (苗粲), the son of the deceased chancellor Miao Jinqing, had spoken words defamatory to Emperor Dezong, but because the matter was unclear, he wanted to make sure that Lu sent Miao Can and his brothers, all of whom shared names with ancient monarchs, to posts with few authorities; and that he believed that Lu was being overly avoiding entanglement by refusing to accept any gifts. Lu wrote a lengthy response, pointing out, as to discussing the matters with Zhao, that chancellors properly should discuss important matters with each other; that, as to Miao Can's matter, that the law must be observed and where there was no evidence that Miao had carried out wrongdoing, it would be wrong to exile him based on innuendo; and, as to the matter of accepting gifts, that refusing all gifts was the best method to avoid appearance of favoritism.

Meanwhile, Li Sun, who had been demoted previously by Dou Can but who was now Dou's superior, submitted accusations that Dou had accepted gifts from Liu Shining (劉士寧), the military governor of Xuanwu Circuit (宣武, headquartered in modern Kaifeng, Henan). Emperor Dezong, in anger, wanted to execute Dou, but Lu, pointing out that Dou's guilt was uncertain, argued that Dou should be spared. Emperor Dezong initially agreed, but soon still ordered Dou to commit suicide and confiscated his assets. (Despite Lu's submission, it was still commonly believed at the time that Lu had, due to his old rivalry with Dou, instigated Dou's death, causing Lu's reputation to suffer.)

Also in 793, Zhao was made Menxia Shilang (門下侍郎), the deputy head of the examination bureau (門下省) instead of Zhongshu Shilang, but remained chancellor. Nevertheless, Zhao, believing this to be a plot by Lu to squeeze him out of power (since the office of the chancellor was within the legislative bureau), became resentful of Lu and often used illness as an excuse not to be involved in major decisions.

In winter 793, Liu Shining, whose commission was not out of Emperor Dezong's own choice, was expelled by his own officer Li Wanrong (李萬榮). Lu advocated sending an imperial official to replace Liu as military governor, but Emperor Dezong, fearing a possible rebellion, made Li Wanrong the acting military governor, against Lu's advice.

In 794, Lu proposed that some of the exiled officials be allowed to move closer to the capital. Emperor Dezong initially agreed, but became alarmed when he believed that Lu was moving them too close to the capital. Lu pointed out that Emperor Dezong's refusal to move them would mean that some highly talented officials would never get a chance to serve again, but it is not known how Emperor Dezong reacted to this. Lu also pointed out that Emperor Dezong was commissioning officials too much based on their ability to speak and as to whether he liked them or not, but Emperor Dezong refused to heed his advice. Lu further submitted a major six-point proposal to reform the taxation and land ownership system, believing that the then-existing system was becoming inequitable:

1. That the "two taxes" (兩稅) system at the time was encouraging the people to hide assets, and those whose assets could not be hidden (land owners or farmers) were bearing an inordinate amount of tax burden.
2. That the two taxes system, which also relied on a conversion formula of goods to cash, was using improper conversion formulas. (He proposed, instead, that the conversions be abolished, and that the taxes be collected in forms of food or textile directly.)
3. That the taxation system was causing the local officials to find ways to increase their locales' population, taxes, and irrigable lands, without regard for harm to other locales.
4. That the taxation deadlines were being arbitrarily set.
5. That the tea tax should be used to buy surplus food to be used in case of emergencies.
6. That the land rents that the large land owners were charging at the time was creating burdens too great for tenant farmers, and should be reduced.

It is not clearly stated in history how Emperor Dezong reacted, but he appeared to reject Lu's proposal. Meanwhile, Lu was continuing to attack Pei for frivolousness, greed, and dishonesty, but Emperor Dezong, pleased with Pei that Pei was causing more money to be available to Emperor Dezong personally, was happy with Pei and thus displeased when Lu attacked him. Meanwhile, though, Lu, unaware that Zhao resented him, was often discussing these faults of Pei's with Zhao, and Zhao in turn alerted Pei as to how Lu was attacking him, allowing Pei to deflect the criticism when meeting Emperor Dezong. In winter 794, Lu was removed from his chancellor position and made an advisor to Li Song.

== Exile ==
As soon as Lu Zhi was removed from his chancellor position, Pei Yanling begin attacking him as well as his allies Li Chong (李充), Zhang Pang (張滂), and Li Xian (李銛), accusing them of fostering dissent among the imperial guard ranks. When, subsequently, an imperial guard soldier did complain to Emperor Dezong that he was not receiving adequate supplies from the directory of finances, Emperor Dezong believed Pei's accusations, and in summer 795 demoted Lu, Li Chong, Zhang, and Li Xian all to be prefectural secretaries general – in Lu's case, to be the secretary general of Zhong Prefecture (忠州, in modern Chongqing). This caused Lu to be directly serving under an official that he had previously demoted, Li Jifu – who was the prefect of Zhong Prefecture. Lu's relatives and friends were all alarmed, fearful that Li Jifu would carry out reprisals. However, when Lu arrived in Zhong Prefecture, Li Jifu honored him as if he were still a chancellor, and while Lu initially feared that reprisals would come later, they eventually became close friends.

Lu was at Zhong Prefecture for 10 years, and it was said that he often stayed at home; he did not handle official business much, nor did he write much, in fear that he would draw further disaster by doing so. Later, when Li Jifu was succeeded by one Xue Yan (薛延), Emperor Dezong sent a messenger to comfort Lu, showing still some respect for Lu. Wei Gao also repeatedly submitted petitions requesting that he be allowed to yield his position to Lu. After Emperor Dezong died in 805 and Li Song became emperor (as Emperor Shunzong), Emperor Shunzong issued an edict recalling Lu, along with three other officials that Emperor Dezong had exiled — Yang Cheng (陽城, who had been demoted for defending Lu), Zheng Yuqing, and Han Gao (韓皐). However, before the edict could arrive at Lu's and Yang's locations, they died. Lu was posthumously honored and given the posthumous name Xuan (宣, meaning "responsible").

== Notes and references ==
- Old Book of Tang, vol. 139.
- New Book of Tang, vol. 157.
- Zizhi Tongjian, vols. 228, 229, 230, 231, 232, 233, 234, 235, 236.
