= Liu Yan (Tang dynasty) =

Liu Yan (Chinese: 劉晏; c. 715/716 – August 12, 780), courtesy name Shi'an (Chinese: 士安), was a Chinese economist and politician during the Tang dynasty who served briefly as chancellor during the reign of Emperor Daizong – but who was more known for his reforms in the Tang salt monopoly and food transportation systems, credited with allowing the Tang economy to recover after the disastrous An Lushan Rebellion. In 780, during the reign of Emperor Daizong's son Emperor Dezong, after the chancellor Yang Yan made a series of false accusations against him, he was first demoted and then executed.

== Background ==
Liu Yan was born in 715 or 716. His family was from Cao Prefecture (曹州, in modern Heze, Shandong), and traced its ancestry to Liu Jiao (劉交), a younger brother of Han dynasty's founder Emperor Gao. His great-great-grandfather Liu Jin (劉晉) served as a county magistrate during Tang dynasty's predecessor Sui dynasty, and his great-grandfather Liu Yu (劉郁) served as an imperial scholar early in Tang. His grandfather Liu Gong (劉功) served as a county magistrate, while his father Liu Zhihui (劉知晦) served as a county secretary general.

== During Emperor Xuanzong's reign ==
When Emperor Xuanzong offered sacrifices at Mount Tai in 725, Liu Yan, then a child, wrote a song and submitted it to Emperor Xuanzong. Emperor Xuanzong was amazed, and he had his chancellor Zhang Yue test Liu's knowledge. Zhang was also impressed and stated, "This is a sign of fortune for the empire." He made Liu a scribe in the imperial government, at his young age, and Liu became referred to as the "godly child." The honored men all rushed to invite him to their households.

During Emperor Xuanzong's Tianbao era (742–756), Liu became the magistrate of Xia County (夏縣, in modern Yuncheng, Shanxi). Xia County was a key point for transportation of supplies to the Tang capital Chang'an, and it was said that while Liu did not supervise the transportation of supplies through his county in a harsh manner, the supplies were nevertheless always on time. After receiving a recommendation, he was then made the magistrate of Wen County (溫縣, in modern Jiaozuo, Henan). It was said that the people were happy about his governance and made monuments for him. He was later recalled to Chang'an to serve as Shiyushi (侍御史), a low-level imperial censor.

== During Emperor Suzong's reign ==
In 755, the general An Lushan rebelled at Fanyang and by 756, the forces of his new state of Yan were approaching Chang'an, forcing Emperor Xuanzong to flee to Chengdu. Liu Yan fled to Xiangyang. Emperor Xuanzong's son and crown prince Li Heng fled to Lingwu instead, where he was declared emperor (as Emperor Suzong), an act that Emperor Xuanzong recognized. Emperor Xuanzong, however, prior to Emperor Suzong's declaration as emperor, had sent another son, Li Lin the Prince of Yong, to Jianling to oversee the Yangtze River region. When Li Lin arrived at Jiangling, he heard that Liu was at Xiangfan and invited him to serve on his staff. Liu declined, however, and wrote a letter to the chancellor Fang Guan, pointing out that at this point, having imperial princes with great powers would simply bring trouble. Emperor Suzong then issued an edict making Liu the tax collector for the Yangtze-Huai River region. When Liu reached Wu Commandery (roughly modern Suzhou, Jiangsu), he heard that Li Lin had rebelled against Emperor Suzong, and therefore met with the surveyor of the region, Li Xiyan (李希言), to confer on how to resist Li Lin. Li Xiyan put Liu in defense of Yuhang Commandery (餘杭, roughly modern Hangzhou, Zhejiang). After Li Xiyan was defeated by Li Lin late in 756, he fled to Yuhang and defended it together with Liu. In 757, after Li Lin was defeated by other Tang generals, he initially considered attacking Yuhang, but after hearing that Liu was defending it, he changed his mind and fled west. (He was eventually captured and killed by another Tang general, Huangfu Shen (皇甫侁).) Liu, however, did not claim credit for the victory. At a later point, Emperor Suzong recalled him to serve as the governor of Pengyuan Commandery (彭原, roughly modern Qingyang, Gansu). He later served as the prefect of Hua Prefecture (華州, in modern Weinan, Shaanxi), and then the mayor of Henan Municipality (河南), which encompassed the eastern capital Luoyang. However, as at that time Tang forces were still stalemated against the Yan emperor by that point, Shi Chaoyi (the son of An Lushan's general Shi Siming), and Luoyang was still in Yan hands, Liu's government seat was actually at Changshui (長水, near Luoyang).

Liu had already proved his worth by using impressed labor to dredge the long silted-over canal connecting the Huai and Yellow rivers; this project lowered transport costs, relieved food shortages, and increased tax revenues with little government investment. The Huai river ran through Northern Jiangsu, the location of coastal salt marshes which were the major source of salt. Liu realized that if the government could control these areas to enforce a salt monopoly, such as had existed in earlier periods but fallen into disuse, it could sell the salt at a monopoly price to merchants, who would pass the increased price on to their customers. This monopoly price was an indirect tax which was reliably collected in advance without having to control the areas where the salt was consumed. In 758 Liu created a Salt and Iron Commission whose revenues were particularly important since the central government had lost control of the provinces. Even better, the revenue originated in the south, where it could be safely used to buy grain to ship to the capital, Chang'an, by river and canal.

By 760, Liu Yan was serving as the mayor of Jingzhao Municipality (京兆), which encompassed Chang'an, when he, because he was believed to be capable in financial matters, was also made the deputy minister of census (戶部侍郎, Hubu Shilang), as well as the special director in charge of finance, minting, and salt and iron monopolies. It was said that in these positions, Liu was not harsh but had a good grasp of the big picture, and that he served well.

In 761, the official Yan Zhuang (嚴莊), who had previously served An but later submitted to Tang, was accused of having secret communications with Shi Chaoyi. After Yan was arrested, Liu sent soldiers to guard Yan's mansion, ready to seize it if Yan were found guilty. Yan, however, was soon exonerated, and became resentful of Liu. Yan therefore accused Liu of leaking contents of secret conversations that he had with Emperor Suzong. As a result of these counteraccusations, and also because the chancellor Xiao Hua was jealous of Liu's talents, both Liu and Yan were demoted — in Liu's case, to be the prefect of Tong Prefecture (通州, in modern Dazhou). His financial responsibilities were transferred to Yuan Zai.

== During Emperor Daizong's reign ==
Emperor Suzong died in 762 and was succeeded by his son Emperor Daizong. Emperor Daizong recalled Liu Yan to Chang'an to again serve in three posts – deputy minister of census, mayor of Jingzhao Municipality, and special director in charge of finance, minting, salt and iron monopolies, and food shipments. Liu declined the posts of deputy minister of census and mayor of Jingzhao, yielding them to Yan Zhenqing and Yan Wu (嚴武) respectively. In 763, while still serving as special director of the various economy-related matters, he was also made the minister of civil service affairs (libu shangshu 吏部尚書) and given the designation "Jointly Manager of Affairs with the Secretariat-Chancellery" (tong zhongshu menxia pingzhang shi 同中書門下平章事), a cumbersome title indicating his participation in central government deliberations as de facto chancellor. In 764, however, he was accused of having close association with the eunuch Cheng Yuanzhen – who had been exceedingly powerful but who had been removed in 763 after he was blamed for not warning Emperor Daizong about a Tufan invasion – and he, along with a colleague who had been hated by other eunuchs for his role in Cheng's downfall, Li Xian, were removed from their chancellor posts, with Liu being made a member of the staff of Li Kuo the Crown Prince.

The system of monopoly on salt would by 780 help provide more than half of the entire cash revenue of the empire. While his reforms on grain transport helped reduce a significant cost to the empire. His liangshuifa (two-tax system) consolidated and collected property and land tax twice-annually which greatly increased state revenue.

However, later in the year, Liu was put in charge of the affairs of food shipments, taxation, salt and iron monopolies, and food management for the regions of Luoyang, Huai River, and Yangtze River. At that time, the Chang'an region was suffering from a food shortage, after years of warfare. Food supplies coming from the Yangtze region, which had been traveling through Bian River – a canal that connected the Huai River and Yellow River – prior to the Anshi Rebellion, had been unable to travel through it since it had been silted through the years. Instead, the shipments had to travel on the Yangtze River and Han River to Liang Prefecture (梁州, in modern Hanzhong, Shaanxi), and then over the Qinling Mountains to Chang'an – a much more treacherous and costly route. Liu, hoping to restore the Bian River-Yellow River route, personally travelled through the former route to examine it. He then wrote a detailed report to Yuan Zai, who had become a powerful chancellor by that point, explaining the benefits of the Bian River route. With Yuan's support, he began the project to clear Bian River of silt. Upon the completion of the project, the food supplies for the Chang'an regions became plentiful, even during times of poor harvest. Emperor Daizong, complimenting him, stated, "You, lord, are my Marquess of Zuan" — comparing him to the great Han dynasty prime minister Xiao He. By 766, Liu was serving as the minister of census (戶部尚書, Hubu Shangshu), and that year, the financial matters of the state were divided in halves — with him in charge of the eastern half of the empire, and his deputy Diwu Qi in charge of the western half.

By 777, Yuan and his chancellor colleague Wang Jin, both of whom had become entrenched in their positions and become extremely corrupt, finally wore out Emperor Daizong's patience, and Emperor Daizong had them arrested. He ordered Liu to interrogate them, but Liu, not daring to carry this task out along, proposed that five officials, including himself and the chief imperial censor Li Han (李涵), be appointed. Subsequently, Yuan was executed, but at Liu's suggestion that Wang was less culpable than Yuan, Wang's life was spared, although he was demoted to be a prefectural prefect. Subsequently, Chang Gun replaced Yuan, and Chang, jealous of Liu, suggested to Emperor Daizong that Liu, given his contributions, should be made Puye (僕射) – one of the heads of the executive bureau of government (尚書省, Shangshu Sheng); Chang did so with the intent that Liu be stripped of his financial responsibilities. Emperor Daizong made Liu Pushe, but continued to have him be in charge of the financial affairs.

It was said that during the years that Liu was in charge of financial affairs, he carefully selected the officials in charge of financial matters in each region, choosing those who were young, energetic, and talented. Many times, powerful individuals would make recommendations; Liu would take the people that they recommended and put them in honored posts with salaries, but not give them actual responsibilities. It was said that those officials that Liu commissioned were faithful to their tasks and Liu's instructions, even if they were thousands of miles away from the capital.

== During Emperor Dezong's reign ==
Emperor Daizong died in 779 and was succeeded by Li Kuo (as Emperor Dezong). At that time, Han Huang was in charge of the financial matters of the western half of the empire (Diwu Qi having been removed from that post in 770). Emperor Dezong, hearing that Han was harsh and excessive, removed Han from his post and gave the responsibilities for the financial matters of the entire empire to Liu Yan. It was said that he improved the salt monopoly system that Diwu had instituted and increased the earnings tenfold, without any additional impositions on the people.

However, Liu was soon in a precarious position. Yang Yan, a protégé of Yuan's, had become the most powerful chancellor and was well-trusted by Emperor Dezong. Yang had previously served under Liu as deputy minister of civil service affairs, and they did not get along with each other; further, Yang blamed Liu for Yuan's death. At that time, there were rumors that Liu had, during Emperor Daizong's reign, suggested to him that he create his favorite concubine, Consort Dugu, empress. (As Consort Dugu was not Emperor Dezong's mother and had her own son, Li Jiong (李迥) the Prince of Han, it was believed that such a move would have potentially endangered Emperor Dezong's position.) Further, many people had been jealous of Liu's long hold on financial matters. Yang, wanting to avenge Yuan, thus took this opportunity to accuse Liu of having endangered Emperor Dezong's position, along with the official Li Gan (黎幹) and the eunuch Liu Zhongyi (劉忠翼) – both of whom had been executed in 779 under the same accusations of having supported Consort Dugu. Yang's chancellor colleague Cui Youfu opposed further investigation of Liu Yan, but still, in spring 780, at Yang's suggestion, Liu Yan was stripped of his special director status, and the financial responsibilities were returned to the bureaus under the ministry of census, which had previously been responsible for such matters. Subsequently, Emperor Dezong demoted Liu to be the prefect of Zhong Prefecture (忠州, in modern Chongqing).

In fall 780, at Yang's inducement, Liu's superior Yu Zhun (庾準) submitted an accusation that Liu had written a letter to the general Zhu Ci, asking for Zhu's help, and that in the letter to Zhu he wrote many complaints about Emperor Dezong. Yu further accused Liu of having requested additional soldiers for his prefecture with the intent to start a rebellion. Yang urged Emperor Dezong to execute Liu. Emperor Dezong agreed, and he sent eunuchs to Zhong Prefecture to secretly strangle Liu to death, before issuing an edict publicly ordering Liu to commit suicide. It was said that the entire empire mourned Liu's death and believed him to be innocent. His family was exiled to the Lingnan region, and his assets were confiscated. (When his assets were booked in order to be confiscated, it was discovered that Liu had been so honest that as an official that he lacked any real wealth, and those who saw this were further impressed by him.) The warlord Li Zhengji, who had been looking for excuses to complain about imperial governance, submitted a petition stating that Liu had been innocently killed and requested that his family be allowed to return to Chang'an — a petition that Emperor Dezong ignored. Nevertheless, because Liu had been careful at selecting officials, particularly those with financial talents, it was said that for decades following his death, the officials in charge of financial affairs were mostly Liu's old subordinates.

In 784, Emperor Dezong, beginning to believe that Liu was in fact innocent, allowed him to be reburied in his home prefecture. In 789, he further made Liu's sons Liu Zhijing (劉執經) and Liu Zongjing (劉宗經) officials. When Liu Zhijing offered to yield his posts in exchange for Liu Yan to be posthumously honored, Emperor Dezong posthumously honored Liu Yan Situ (司徒, one of the Three Excellencies).

Liu Xu, the lead editor of the Old Book of Tang, commented thus about Liu Yan:

Throughout the generations, not one of the officials in charge of financial matters would fail to oppress the people to provide for the emperor; to harm others to provide for himself; to change laws to abuse power; and to create hatred to bring disaster to himself. Someone like Liu Yan, who coordinated the supplies, used talented and capable people, such that the empire was wealthy but the people were not burdened and that he himself was frugal and allowed the people to benefit, was almost otherwise not known in history. Some might question the authenticity of the records and ask, "As for Zi Chan of Zheng, his subordinates were unable to defraud him. As for Mi Zi [(宓子)] of Song, his subordinates did not have the heart to defraud him. As for Ximen Bao [(西門豹)] of Wei, his subordinates did not dare to defraud him. These three gentlemen were among the most capable of antiquity, but their subordinates did want to defraud him — just that they were unable, did not have the heart, or did not dare to defraud him. How was it that Liu Yan's subordinates, no matter near or far, did not even consider defrauding him?" My response would be, "Because Liu Yan selected proper individuals and allowed them to fully exercise their abilities." Could this not be shown from how, after his death, his subordinates continued to control the financial affairs for over 20 years? The Biographies of Economists in the Records of the Grand Historian stated, "Suppressing food prices and making sure that there were no lack of goods are the ways to allow the state to be calm." When Liu Yan was in charge of the taxations, the prices were flat, with nothing particularly expensive and nothing particularly cheap. How can those who just talk about how to rule the nation and comfort the state compare to him? It was out of faithfulness that Liu Yan recommended Yan Zhenqing; it was out of fairness that he decreased Wang Jin's punishment. Both his faithfulness and fairness exceeded his colleagues. However, if there was a particularly large tree in the forest, the winds would eventually destroy it. He first suffered jealousy from Chang Gun and later false accusations from Yang Yan, and this causes me to sigh. There were also those who satirized Liu Yan and stated that he sealed the mouths of those who attacked him with money. However, without sealing these harmful, accusatory mouths, how could Liu Yan have received his power, and without his power, how could he have exercised his talent and saved the empire? This was only his power-play and no reason to satirize him.

== Notes and references ==
- Old Book of Tang, vol. 123.
- New Book of Tang, vol. 149.
- Zizhi Tongjian, vols. 221, 222, 223, 224, 225, 226
