= Cui Sun =

Cui Sun (崔損) (died November 27, 803), courtesy name Zhiwu (至無), was an official of the Chinese Tang dynasty, serving as a chancellor during the reign of Emperor Dezong.

== Background ==
It is not known when Cui Sun was born. His family was from the "Elder Boling branch" of the prominent Cui clan of Bolin, although, as far as Cui Sun's branch was concerned, after Cui Sun's great-grandfather Cui Xinggong (崔行功), who served as the director of the Palace Library, his grandfather and father were said to have little reputation, and their names were not even recorded in the New Book of Tang's table of the chancellors' family trees.

== Early career ==
Toward the end of Emperor Daizong's Dali era (766–779), Cui Sun passed the imperial examinations and was made a scribe at the archival bureau. He later served as the sheriff of Xianyang County (咸陽, in modern Xianyang, Shaanxi), within the capital municipality of Jingzhao (京兆). However, later, because his maternal uncle Wang Hong (王翃) was the mayor of Jingzhao Municipality and thus could not properly serve as his superior, Cui was made a Dali Pingshi (大理評事), a judge at the supreme court (大理寺). He later became Bingbu Langzhong (兵部郎中), a supervisorial official at the ministry of defense (兵部, Bingbu). He later became You Jianyi Daifu (右諫議大夫), a high-level consultant at the legislative bureau of government (中書省, Zhongshu Sheng) in 795.

== As chancellor ==
In 796, with the chancellor Zhao Jing having recently died and another chancellor, Lu Mai, seriously ill and unable to tend to affairs of state, Emperor Dezong made Cui Sun and Zhao Zongru chancellors with the designation Tong Zhongshu Menxia Pingzhangshi (同中書門下平章事) — in Cui's case, because he had been recommended by Emperor Dezong's close associate Pei Yanling, who had himself recently died as well. It was said that at the time, with two chancellors recently having died or been incapacitated, the people were hoping for virtuous chancellors, and with Cui not having had a good reputation, the people were disappointed. Further, it was said that after Cui became chancellor, he was not virtuous in his behavior, and was carefully avoiding to offend the emperor in any way, and therefore rarely spoke when Emperor Dezong met with the chancellors.

In 798, Cui was made Menxia Shilang (門下侍郎), the deputy head of the examination bureau (門下省, Menxia Sheng), and continued to serve as chancellor. That year, the funereal palace (i.e., a palace intended to be built for the spirit of the deceased emperor) at Emperor Taizong's tomb Zhaoling (昭陵) was destroyed in a wildfire. Emperor Dezong commissioned Cui to head the project to rebuild not only that funereal palace, but also at Xianling (獻陵, Emperor Gaozu's tomb), Qianling (Emperor Gaozong's tomb), Dingling (定陵, Emperor Zhongzong's tomb), Tailing (泰陵, Emperor Xuanzong's tomb), Qiaoling (橋陵, Emperor Ruizong's tomb), and Yuanling (元陵, Emperor Daizong's tomb), as well as repairs to the funereal palace at Jianling (建陵, Emperor Suzong's tomb).

Late in Cui's service as chancellor, he was often ill and staying at home. It was said that while he went through many important posts at both the legislative and examination bureaus and served as chancellor, he served without distinction. He was also criticized for not expanding the tomb of his mother and not attending the funeral of his older sister (who had become a Buddhist nun). It was further said that Emperor Dezong knew that the popular sentiment was that Cui was not a suitable chancellor, but because Cui served him carefully, he continued to favor Cui. Cui died in 803 and was given posthumous honors.

== Notes and references ==
- Old Book of Tang, vol. 136.
- New Book of Tang, vol. 167.
- Zizhi Tongjian, vols. 235, 236.
