= Lu Yin =

Lu Yin may refer to:

- Lu Yin (Eastern Wu) (fl. 3rd century), Eastern Wu official of the Three Kingdoms period
- Lü Yin (712–762), Tang dynasty official
- Lu Yin (writer) (1899–1934), Chinese writer

== See also ==
- Yin Lu (born 1989), Chinese footballer, known as Lu Yin in the Western name order
