= Han Huang =

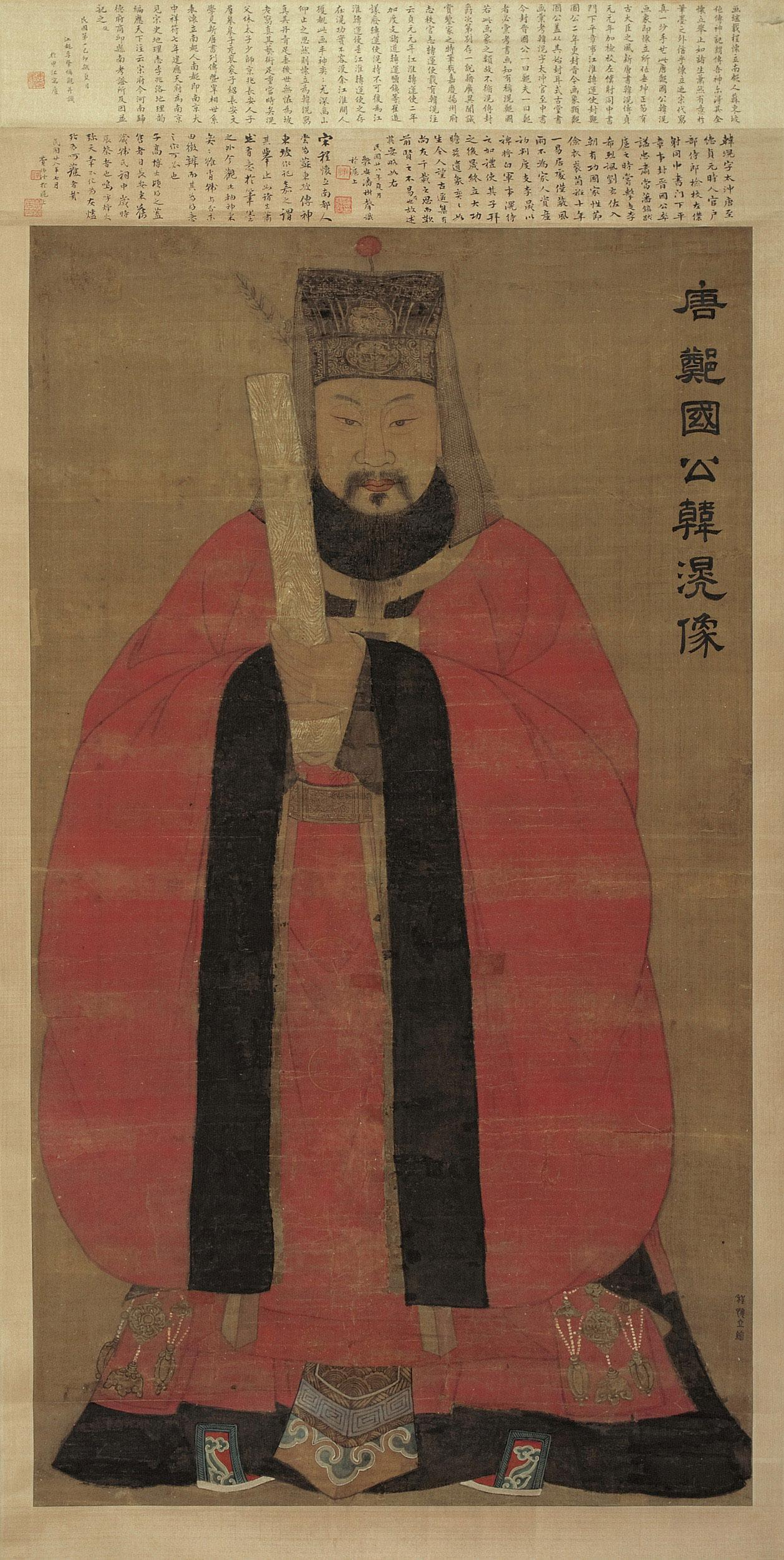
Song dynasty painting of Han Huang

Han Huang (Chinese: 韓滉) (723 – March 17, 787), courtesy name Taichong (太沖), formally Duke Zhongsu of Jin (晉忠肅公), was a Chinese economist, painter and politician of the Tang dynasty, serving as a chancellor during the reign of the Emperor Dezong. He was praised by traditional historians for his frugality and personal integrity, but blamed for being overly harsh and cruel in his governance.

== Background ==
Han Huang was born in 723, during the reign of Emperor Xuanzong. His family was from the Tang dynasty capital Chang'an and traced its ancestry to the royal house of the Warring States period state Han. It also claimed, as ancestors, a line of officials during the Han dynasty, Jin dynasty (266–420), Northern Wei, Northern Qi, Northern Zhou, Sui dynasty, and Tang. His father Han Xiu was an important official early during the middle of Emperor Xuanzong's reign and briefly served as chancellor in 733. He had at least five older brothers – Han Hao (韓浩), Han Qia (韓洽), Han Hong (韓洪), Han Huan (韓澣), and Han Hong (韓汯, note different character than his other brother) – and at least three younger brothers – among whom were Han Hun (韓渾) and Han Hui (韓洄). Han Huang himself was said to be firm and studious in his youth. Because of his heritage, he was made an officer in the imperial guards early.

In 755, the general and jiedushi (military governor) An Lushan rebelled at Fanyang, and by summer 756 the armies of his new state of Yan were approaching Chang'an, forcing Emperor Xuanzong to flee. After Chang'an fell to Yan forces, Yan forces tried to force Han Hao to serve in the Yan administration. Han Hao, Han Hong (韓洪), Han Hong (韓汯), Han Huang, and Han Hun tried to flee Chang'an and join Emperor Xuanzong's crown prince Li Heng, who would be proclaimed emperor at Lingwu (as Emperor Suzong). However, Han Hao, Han Hong (韓洪) and his four sons, and Han Hun were captured by Yan forces and executed although Han Hong (韓汯) and Han Huang were able to get away. Emperor Suzong honored the Han family members who were killed with posthumous honors.

== During Emperor Suzong's reign ==
Early in the Zhide era (756–758) of Emperor Suzong, Deng Jingshan (鄧景山) the military governor (Jiedushi) of Qingqi Circuit (青齊, headquartered in modern Weifang, Shandong) invited Han Huang to be his secretary and the military commander of the militia of Qingqi's capital Beihai Commandery. However, with the realm engulfed in warfare at the time, Han was not able to report to Qingqi, and he fled to Shannan Circuit (山南, headquartered in modern Hanzhong, Shaanxi). The surveyor of Shannan, Li Chengzhao (李承昭), had Han serve as his secretary. Subsequently, when Deng was moved to Huainan Circuit (淮南, headquartered in modern Yangzhou, Jiangsu), he again asked for Han to serve on his staff, but before Han could report to Huainan, he was recalled to Chang'an, then again under Tang control, to serve as Dianzhong Shiyushi (殿中侍御史), a low-level imperial censor. However, Han Hong (韓汯) had offended the chancellor Wang Yu by failing to praise Wang with grand words when drafting the edict promoting Wang, and therefore, after Wang became chancellor in 758, he retaliated by putting the Han brothers in positions with no power. After Wang was removed from his chancellor position in 759, the popular opinion was that they had been unfairly treated, and Han Huang thereafter successively served as Sibu Yuanwailang (祠部員外郎), a low-level official at the ministry of rites (禮部, Lǐbu); Kaogong Yuanwailang (考功員外郎), and then Lìbu Yuanwailang (吏部員外郎), both low-level officials at the ministry of civil service affairs (吏部, Lìbu, note different tone than the ministry of rites). It was said that Han Huang was capable at evaluating officials and strong in character, and during the five years he served as Libu Yuanwailang, he paid great attention to detail and knew the records well.

== During Emperor Daizong's reign ==
During the Dali era (766–779) of Emperor Suzong's son Emperor Daizong, Han Huang was promoted to be Libu Langzhong (吏部郎中), who supervised the Libu Yuanwailang, as well as imperial attendant (給事中, Jishizhong). At that time, there was an incident where Wei Dang (韋當), the magistrate of Fuping County (富平, near Chang'an) was assassinated. After the assassins were captured, it was discovered that they were members of the Northern Army (北軍), under the command of the powerful eunuch Yu Chao'en. Yu sought a pardon for them on account of their military abilities, but Han Huang submitted a secret petition opposing Yu's request, and the assassins were executed. Han was thereafter made Shangshu You Cheng (尚書右丞), one of the secretaries general of the executive bureau of government (尚書省, Shangshu Sheng). In 770, he was put in charge of selecting officials for the ministry of defense (兵部, Bingbu). In 771, he was made the deputy minister of census (戶部侍郎, Hubu Shilang) and put in charge of the economic affairs for the western half of the empire, replacing Diwu Qi. At that time, the imperial treasury was drained due to chronic wars and corruption. Once Han was in charge, he concentrated on details and stamped out corruption, and whenever he found corruption in his subordinates or in local official, he sought to punish them harshly. Further, by that point, there had been reduced instances of Tufan and Huige incursions and several straight good harvests, and therefore the imperial treasury was able to be replenished. However, it was also said that Han was cruel, unrelenting in his pursuit of money, and stripping all the revenues he could find. As a result, he drew much resentment.

In fall 777, major rainstorms fell on the western parts of the empire. Many of the salt pools at Hezhong Municipality (河中, in modern Yuncheng, Shanxi) were damaged, but Han, not willing to exempt the taxes from the households in charge of the salt pools, submitted a report claiming that the pools not only were not damaged, but there was an unusual kind of salt being formed that showed good fortune. Emperor Daizong doubted this, and sent the officials Jiang Zhen (蔣鎮) to examine the salt pools. Jiang, after return from Hezhong, confirmed Han's report, and further requested that a shrine be established to celebrate the divine blessing. Emperor Dezong agreed, but this was viewed by popular sentiment as a major scandal at the time. Around the same time, Li Gan (黎幹) the mayor of Jingzhao Municipality (京兆, i.e., the Chang'an region) submitted a report stating that the fields of Jingzhao were being heavily damaged. Han, again fearing tax exemptions, stated that there was no damage. One of Li's subordinates, Liu Zao (劉藻) the magistrate of Weinan County (渭南, in modern Weinan, Shaanxi), wanted to ingratiate Han, and therefore submitted a report claiming no damage. The imperial censor Zhao Ji (趙計) also confirmed this report, but Emperor Daizong became suspicious and sent another censor, Zhu Ao (朱敖), to reexamine, and Zhu pointed out that much damage was being incurred. Emperor Daizong exiled Liu and Zhao, but did not punish Han.

== During Emperor Dezong's reign ==
In 779, Emperor Daizong died and was succeeded by his son Emperor Dezong. Emperor Dezong had heard about Han Huang's harshness, and therefore stripped him of his financially related responsibilities and made him the minister of worship (太常卿, Taichang Qing), transferring his responsibilities to Liu Yan. He then sent Han out of Chang'an to serve as the prefect of Jin Prefecture (晉州, in modern Linfen, Shanxi). Later in the year, he made Han the prefect of Su Prefecture (蘇州, in modern Suzhou, Jiangsu) and governor (觀察使, Guanchashi) of Zhejiang Circuit (浙江東西道). In 781, he made Han the prefect of Run Prefecture (潤州, in modern Zhenjiang, Jiangsu) and military governor (Jiedushi) of Zhenhai Circuit (鎮海, i.e., same area as Zhejiang Circuit). It was said that Han was an effective governor, and that he comforted the people and balanced the taxes. However, it was also said that he was harsh, and that whenever local minor officials – often members of strong local clans – committed crimes, he would execute them without mercy, believing that by doing so he would be stamping out potential rebellions against his rule. For the same reason, he also banned the slaughtering of cattle, under the rationale that beef and wine were often used at feasts that were preludes to rebellions. He also executed large numbers of people due to allegations of crimes without certainty of their guilt, leading to much terror in the region.

In 783, due to Zhu Ci's rebellion, Emperor Dezong fled from Chang'an to Fengtian (奉天, in modern Xianyang, Shaanxi). With the empire thrown into confusion, Han trained his soldiers in preparation of war, and he also sent soldiers to aid the campaign against another rebel, Li Xilie, who had declared himself the emperor of Chu. His soldiers were instrumental in aiding the general Liu Qia (劉洽) in recapturing Bian Prefecture (汴州, in modern Kaifeng, Henan) from Li Xilie. He also prohibited people from entering and exiting Zhenhai Circuit and built fortresses (including rebuilding Shitou) and fleets, under the rationale that if Emperor Dezong decided to evacuate the Chang'an region and flee to the Yangtze River region like what occurred with the Jin dynasty (266–420), Zhenhai could become the emperor's base for recovery, and also to defend against potential attacks by Li Xilie's one-time ally Chen Shaoyou (陳少遊), the military governor of neighboring Huainan Circuit (淮南, headquartered in modern Yangzhou, Jiangsu). This, however, led to suspicions that he was intending to rule Zhenhai as an effective independent realm. Meanwhile, though, because he was shipping supplies to Emperor Dezong, Emperor Dezong awarded him the title of Duke of Nanyang. Emperor Dezong was suspicious of Han's intentions. However, by 784, after Zhu's rebellion was defeated, with the Chang'an region stricken by a serious famine, at the persuasion of his key advisor Li Mi, he alleviated Han's apprehension by sending Han's son Han Gao (韓皐) to Zhenhai to request that he send food supplies as soon as possible. In response, Han sent a large supply of rice, causing Emperor Dezong to be very happy with him. His trust in Han was further enhanced when Chen died later in the year, and Han was able to dissuade Chen's subordinate Wang Shao (王韶) from starting a disturbance to take over Huainan. He gave Han the honorary chancellor designation Tong Zhongshu Menxia Pingzhangshi (同中書門下平章事) and put him in charge of the Yangtze-Huai River supply system. Han was created the Duke of Zheng, and later his title was changed to Duke of Jin.

In 786, Han headed to Chang'an to pay homage to Emperor Dezong – and ultimately, he would remain there until his death, even though he retained the title of military governor of Zhenhai as well. As he went through Bian Prefecture, he also persuaded Liu Qia, whose name had been changed to Liu Xuanzuo (劉玄佐), to go to Chang'an to pay homage to the emperor as well, by means of making large payments to both Liu and his army. Once he arrived at Chang'an, he began to exercise actual chancellor authorities, and he attacked the official Yuan Xiu (元琇), whom the chancellor Cui Zao had put in charge of financial affairs for improprieties. With Emperor Dezong particularly happy about the large shipments of supplies that Han was shipping from Zhenhai to Chang'an, he put Han again in charge of the financial affairs. In late 786, he tried to defuse the tension between the major general Li Sheng, with him he was friendly, and Zhang Yanshang, by holding feasts (along with Liu Xuanzuo) for them and asking them to be sworn brothers. He also supported Li Sheng's advocacy for military action against Tufan.

Meanwhile, it was said that Han was so trusted by Emperor Dezong that he had the greatest authority among chancellors. He was also described to be so harsh that he would even batter minor officials to death within the office of the chancellors. Fellow chancellor Liu Hun, whom he had recommended, sternly spoke to him about this, and thereafter, it was said that Han was embarrassed and curbed his ways slightly. He died in spring 787 and was buried with great honors.

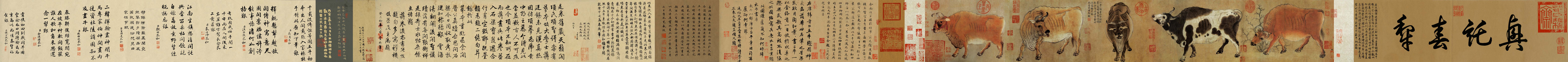
"Five Oxen" by Han Huang (723–787), the earliest paper scroll painting of note by an identified artist

== Notes and references ==
- Old Book of Tang, vol. 129.
- New Book of Tang, vol. 126.
- Zizhi Tongjian, vols. 224, 225, 226, 227, 229, 230, 231, 232.
