= Diwu Qi =

Economist and chancellor under Emperor Suzong during the Tang dynasty

Diwu Qi (第五琦) (712 or 713 – September 19, 782), courtesy name Yugui (禹珪), formally the Duke of Fufeng (扶風公), was a Chinese economist and politician during the Tang dynasty who served briefly as chancellor during the reign of Emperor Suzong, but was more known for his influence on the economic policies that Suzong enacted throughout his career, including his advocacy for the state-run monopolies over salt and iron.

== Background ==
Diwu Qi was born in either 712 or 713. His family was from the Tang dynasty capital Chang'an and traced its ancestry to the legendary Emperor Shun and the royal house of the Warring States state Qi. He lost his parents early, and it was said that he respected and obeyed his older brother Diwu Hua (第五華) dearly. After he was grown, he showed good administrative skills and ambition to enrich the empire and strengthen its armies.

== During Emperor Xuanzong's reign ==
Late in the reign of Emperor Xuanzong, Diwu Qi served under an economics-minded official, Wei Jian (韋堅). After Wei was removed from office in 746 (and later killed) due to the machinations of the chancellor Li Linfu, Diwu was demoted, and eventually served as the secretary general for Xujiang County (須江, in modern Quzhou, Zhejiang). He was respected by Helan Jinming (賀蘭進明), the governor of the commandery that Xujiang belonged to, Xin'an Commandery. After the general An Lushan rebelled at Fanyang Circuit (范陽, headquartered in modern Beijing), Helan was made the governor of Beihai Commandery (roughly modern Weifang, Shandong), and he recommended Diwu to be his managerial officer (錄事參軍, Lushi Canjun). At that time, An's forces had captured five nearby commanderies, and Helan was unable to counter. Emperor Xuanzong, displeased, sent a eunuch emissary to Beihai in order to scare Helan — by stating the instructions of, "If Helan cannot recover the territory, cut off his head." Helan was fearful, and Diwu suggested expending the money from the commandery storage to retain an assault corps; Helan agreed, and the assault corps thus retained were able to help him to recapture Xindu Commandery (roughly modern Hengshui, Hebei).

== During Emperor Suzong's reign ==
After the victory, Helan Jinming sent Diwu Qi to report the victory to Emperor Xuanzong. By that point — summer 756 or thereafter — forces of An's new state of Yan had captured Chang'an, forcing Emperor Xuanzong to flee to Chengdu. Emperor Xuanzong's son and crown prince Emperor Suzong did not follow him to Chengdu, but fled to Lingwu instead, where he was proclaimed emperor (as Emperor Suzong) — an act that Emperor Xuanzong recognized when news reached him. Diwu met either Emperor Xuanzong or Emperor Suzong — his biographies in the Old Book of Tang and the New Book of Tang conflict in that regard, with the Old Book of Tang indicating that he met Emperor Xuanzong and the New Book of Tang indicating that he met Emperor Suzong, and the Zizhi Tongjian trying to harmonize the conflict by indicating that he met Emperor Xuanzong and then Emperor Suzong — and was able to persuade the emperor that the primary task at hand was for the imperial treasury to be replenished with funds from the relatively wealthy Yangtze River-Huai River region so that soldiers could be retained. The emperor agreed and put Diwu in charge of the financial matters of the Yangtze-Huai region. Diwu created an official monopoly over salt and iron and recruited people willing to work in those industries, using the profits to replenish the imperial treasury without increasing taxes. Soon, the Henan region (i.e., modern Henan and Shandong) were added to his region of responsibility, and he was additionally made the deputy minister of census (戶部侍郎, Hubu Shilang). In 758, with prices for goods rising heavily and the realm lacking coins, at Diwu's suggestion, Emperor Suzong ordered that special coins titled Qianyuan Zhongbao (乾元重寶, Qianyuan being the era name at that time), with each Qianyuan Zhongbao coin being worth 10 ordinary coins.

In 759, as part of Emperor Suzong's reorganization of his chancellors, Miao Jinqing and Wang Yu were removed from their chancellor positions, and Diwu, along with Lü Yin, Li Xian, and Li Kui, were made chancellors, with the designation Tong Zhongshu Menxia Pingzhangshi (同中書門下平章事). After Diwu became chancellor, he further minted special coins with double circular edges (重輪錢, Chonglun Qian), worth 50 ordinary coins. At that time, food prices rose precipitously, leading to much hunger and starvation, and there were also many forgeries of the new coins. The popular sentiment blamed Diwu for the misery, and many accusations were filed against him. In winter 759, Emperor Suzong demoted Diwu to be the secretary general of Zhong Prefecture (忠州, in modern Chongqing). Diwu's old superior Helan was accused of associating with him and was also demoted. After Diwu left Chang'an, there was another accusation that Diwu had accepted 200 taels of gold in bribes, and Emperor Suzong sent the imperial censor Liu Qiguang (劉期光) to chase Diwu down to interrogate him. Diwu responded, somewhat sarcastically:

I was a chancellor, and I could not have always carried 200 taels of gold around with me. If you could find that someone had paid, and someone had received it, please go ahead and carry out judgment according to law.

Liu took this to be an admission of guilt and submitted a report indicating that Diwu had admitted guilt. Diwu was removed from his official rank and exiled to Yi Prefecture (夷州, in modern Zunyi, Guizhou). Not until 762 was he recalled from exile and made the prefect of Lang Prefecture (朗州, in modern Changde, Hunan).

== During Emperor Daizong's reign ==
Diwu Qi was said to have governed Lang Prefecture well, and was eventually recalled to serve on the staff of Li Kuo, the son and crown prince of Emperor Suzong's successor Emperor Daizong. In 763, when Tufan forces launched a surprise attack on Chang'an and forced Emperor Daizong to flee to Shan Prefecture (陝州, roughly modern Sanmenxia, Henan), Emperor Daizong made the general Guo Ziyi the supreme commander of Tang forces in the Guanzhong region, putting him in charge of recapturing and pacifying the Chang'an region. Guo used his authority to make Diwu his deputy, in charge of logistics, and soon also made Diwu the mayor of Jingzhao Municipality (京兆), the special municipality that included Chang'an. After Emperor Daizong returned to Chang'an, Diwu was put in charge of financial matters again and was created the Duke of Fufeng. It was at his suggestion that in 765 that, after a good wheat harvest in the Guanzhong region, taxes were increased to 10% of the wheat harvest. In 766, Emperor Daizong divided the financial affairs of the realm into two halves — with Liu Yan, then the minister of census, in charge of the eastern half and Diwu, who was again made the deputy minister of census, in charge of the western half. Later in 766, with the people fleeing the Guanzhong region to escape the heavy taxation that Diwu imposed, Emperor Daizong issued a general pardon and abolished the taxation that Diwu had suggested. Also, around these times, with many generals making demands on the silk stored in the imperial treasury, Diwu could not meet all of the demands, and tried to make sure that the demands would cease by instead transferring the silk collected as taxes all to the Daying Storage (大盈庫), inside the palace, with the eunuchs in charge. (This, however, brought a serious side effect — as the eunuchs were not required to handle detailed bookkeeping, it became impossible to account for the silk collected. This system was eventually abolished in 779 after the suggestion by then-chancellor Yang Yan.)

At his post, Diwu was in charge of financial matters for more than a decade. In 770, after Emperor Daizong executed the powerful eunuch Yu Chao'en, Diwu was considered Yu's associate and was demoted to be the prefect of Kuo/Chu Prefecture (括州/處州, in modern Wenzhou, Zhejiang). He later served as the prefect of two other prefectures, before he was recalled — but not to Chang'an, but instead to the eastern capital Luoyang — to serve, titularly, again, on the staff of the crown prince.

== During Emperor Dezong's reign ==
After Emperor Daizong's death in 779, Li Kuo succeeded him as Emperor Dezong. He believed Diwu to be capable and in 782 recalled Diwu to Chang'an, ready to promote him. However, Diwu died shortly after arriving in Chang'an, and was buried with honors.
