= Du Huangchang =

Chinese chancellor (died 808)

Du Huangchang (杜黃裳) (738 or 739 – October 12, 808), courtesy name Zunsu (遵素), formally Duke Xuan of Bin (邠宣公) or Duke Xuanxian of Bin (邠宣獻公), was an official of the Chinese Tang dynasty, serving as a chancellor during the reigns of Emperor Shunzong and Emperor Xianzong. He was credited for setting the tone for Emperor Xianzong's hardline stance against warlords, leading to the restoration of imperial authority over the entire empire during Emperor Xianzong's reign.

== Background ==
Du Huangchang was born in 728 or 729, during the reign of Emperor Xuanzong. His family was from Jingzhao Municipality (京兆, i.e., the region of the Tang dynasty capital Chang'an) and claimed ancestry form the Han dynasty official Du Yannian (杜延年). His grandfather Du Hanzhang (杜含章) serve as a prefectural official, while his father Du Wan (杜綰) served as an official at the Jingzhao Municipality government.

== During Emperor Daizong's and Emperor Dezong's reigns ==
Du Huangchang passed the imperial examinations and did well in a special examination on the use of grand language; he was regarded highly by Du Hongjian. He later served as a secretary to Guo Ziyi, then the military governor (Jiedushi) of Shuofang Circuit (朔方, headquartered in modern Yinchuan, Ningxia). In 778, during the reign of Emperor Xuanzong's grandson Emperor Daizong, there was an occasion when Guo was at Chang'an and left Du in charge of the headquarters. The officer Li Huaiguang wanted to seize control of the army, and therefore forged an imperial edict ordering a number of other officers, including Wen Ruya (溫儒雅). Du discovered that the edict was forged and questioned Li. After Li admitted his plan, Du issued orders in Guo's name to have him and several other officers who were difficult to control sent to various military outposts, to secure the headquarters.

At a later unknown time during the reign of Emperor Daizong's son Emperor Dezong, Du Huangchang became an imperial censor with the title Shiyushi (侍御史). However, he was disliked by Emperor Dezong's close associate Pei Yanling and therefore stuck at his position for some 10 years without movement.

== During Emperor Shunzong's reign ==
Emperor Dezong died in 805 and was succeeded by his severely ill son Emperor Shunzong. Emperor Shunzong's close associate Wang Shuwen became very powerful, and Du Huangchang's son-in-law Wei Zhiyi became chancellor because he was an ally of Wang's. Only thereafter was Du made the minister of worship (太常卿). At that time, Wang's partisans were apprehensive of Emperor Shunzong's crown prince Li Chun. On an occasion when Du suggested to Wei that he led the other officials in suggesting that Li Chun be made regent, Wei stated, "You, Father-in-Law, have just received a new position. How would you dare to comment on what happens in the palace?" Du angrily replied, "I, Du Huangchang, have received the grace from three emperors. How can you buy my silence with an office?" He walked out and left his meeting with Wei.

Later in the year, however, several powerful eunuchs seized control of Emperor Shunzong, and because Wang had to leave governmental service to observe a period of mourning for his mother, Wang's partisans began to lose power. At the instigation of the eunuch Ju Wenzhen (俱文珍), Li Chun was made regent. Du was made Menxia Shilang (門下侍郎), the deputy head of the examination bureau of government (門下省, Menxia Sheng) and given the designation Tong Zhongshu Menxia Pingzhangshi (同中書門下平章事), making him a chancellor, along with Yuan Zi. Shortly after, Emperor Shunzong yielded the throne to Li Chun, who took the throne as Emperor Xianzong.

== During Emperor Xianzong's reign ==
Most of Wang Shuwen's partisans were immediately purged, but Wei Zhiyi, as Du Huangchang's son-in-law, remained chancellor for several months before he was exiled to Yai Prefecture (崖州, in modern Sanya, Hainan). While Wei was in exile, Du, despite their differences, protected him from further reprisal, and when Wei died in exile, Du requested permission to have his casket returned and given a proper burial.

Later in 805, when Wei Gao the military governor of Xichuan Circuit (西川, headquartered in modern Chengdu, Sichuan) died, his subordinate Liu Pi seized power and demanded to be officially commissioned as the military governor of Xichuan. Emperor Xianzong initially refused but later decided that he was not ready to fight Liu yet, and so made Liu Pi acting military governor. However, Liu was not satisfied, and demanded two additional circuits — Dongchuan (東川, headquartered in modern Mianyang, Sichuan) and Shannan West (山南西道, headquartered in modern Hanzhong, Shaanxi). When Emperor Xianzong refused, Liu rebelled in spring 806. When Emperor Xianzong consulted his officials as to what they thought he should do, most officials thought that Xichuan was protected by natural barriers and difficult to attack. Du, however, believed that Liu was merely an egomaniacal civilian without military abilities and could be defeated easily. He also recommended the general Gao Chongwen, who was then not well known, to command the operation against Liu. Emperor Xianzong agreed and put Gao in command. It was said that subsequently, Du drafted the strategies against Liu and coordinated them with Gao and the other generals. Knowing that Gao was apprehensive of the abilities of another general, Liu Yong (劉澭), Du warned him that if he were not successful, he would be replaced with Liu Yong, so Gao fought particularly hard during the campaign. Later in the year, Gao defeated and captured Liu Pi, allowing the imperial government to take control of Xichuan. When news of the victory reached Chang'an, it was said that Emperor Xianzong looked at Du and stated, "This is your achievement, Lord."

Further, Du advocated a fundamental change in the mindset that the imperial government had toward regional warlords — he pointed out to Emperor Xianzong that during Emperor Dezong's reign, to avoid rebellions, he appeased the warlords by giving them what they wanted, but that only caused more contempt for the imperial government. He advocated that the imperial government should assert its authority, and Emperor Xianzong agreed. Traditional historians generally credited Du with this change in mindset that eventually led to Emperor Xianzong's reassertion of imperial authority over the entire realm. Also, during 806, when Han Quanyi (韓全義) the military governor of Xiasui Circuit (夏綏, headquartered in modern Yulin, Shaanxi) was at Chang'an, Du, pointing out that Han had previously failed as a general and been disrespectful to Emperor Dezong, ordered Han to retire. Han's nephew Yang Huilin (楊惠琳) then tried to seize control of Xiasui Circuit but was quickly defeated and killed. Thereafter, when Li Shigu the military governor of the powerful Pinglu Circuit (平盧, headquartered in modern Tai'an, Shandong), who had ruled the circuit even more independently from the imperial government than the other circuits, died, and his brother Li Shidao requested to succeed him, Du advocated using the chance to divide Pinglu, but Emperor Xianzong, as the campaign against Xichuan was still ongoing at that point, agreed to let Li Shidao succeed Li Shigu.

Despite Du's accomplishments, however, he was also said to be careless and not particularly clean in his conduct, and therefore unable to retain his position as chancellor for long. In spring 807, Emperor Xianzong, while still letting him carry an honorary chancellor title, made him the military governor of Hezhong Circuit (河中, headquartered in modern Yuncheng, Shanxi) as well as the mayor of its capital Hezhong Municipality. Later in the year, he was created the Duke of Bin. Du died in fall 808, while still serving at Hezhong, and was given posthumous honors. After his death, there were accusations that Du had received a bribe from Gao, and the accusations were confirmed after interrogations of a subordinate of Du's, Wu Ping (吳憑), and Du's son Du Zai (杜載). Emperor Xianzong, remembering Du Huangchang's accomplishments, exiled Wu but took no actions against Du Zai and did not strip Du Huangchang of his honors.

== Notes and references ==
Notes

Bibliography

- Old Book of Tang, vol. 147.
- New Book of Tang, vol. 169.
- Zizhi Tongjian, vols. 225, 236, 237.
