= Lü Yin =

Chinese military general and politician

Lü Yin (呂諲) (712–762), formally Count Su of Xuchang (須昌肅伯), was a Chinese military general and politician during the Tang dynasty, serving as a chancellor during the reign of Emperor Suzong. Historians often regarded him as being more capable as a regional governor, later in his career, than as a chancellor.

== Before serving as chancellor ==
Lü Yin was born in 712, around the time when Emperor Xuanzong became emperor. His family was from Pu Prefecture (蒲州, roughly modern Yuncheng, Shanxi) and traced its ancestry to the ruling Jiang clan of Qi during the Spring and Autumn period. Lü himself was said to be ambitious and studious in his youth, but was poor and could not support himself. A wealthy man from his locale, Cheng Chubin (程楚賔) was impressed with Lü's talent and believed that he would one day be successful, and Cheng decided to give his daughter to Lü in marriage. After the marriage, both Cheng Chubin and his son Cheng Zhen (程震) supported Lü financially, allowing Lü to visit the Tang dynasty capital Chang'an.

Early in Emperor Xuanzong's Tianbao era (742–756), Lü passed the imperial examinations and was made the sheriff of Ningling County. The surveyor of the circuit, Wei Zhi (韋陟), was impressed with Lü's talent and recommended him to serve as deputy surveyor. Later, Geshu Han, the military governor (jiedushi) of Longyou (隴右, headquartered in modern Haidong Prefecture, Qinghai) and Hexi (河西, headquartered in modern Wuwei, Gansu) Circuits invited him to serve on staff as treasurer. While serving under Geshu, it was said that Lü was careful and hardworking, and at times, when his colleagues would be spending time out of the office, Lü would be in his office to review the files. This diligence caused Geshu to favor him more.

In 755, the general An Lushan rebelled at Fanyang Circuit (范陽, headquartered in modern Beijing) and quickly attacked south, capturing the Tang eastern capital Luoyang and establishing a new state of Yan. Geshu was commissioned to try to block Yan advances at Tong Pass, but was defeated there in 756, forcing Emperor Xuanzong to flee Chang'an to Chengdu. Emperor Xuanzong's son and crown prince Li Heng, however, did not follow him to Chengdu, but instead fled to Lingwu, where he was proclaimed emperor (as Emperor Suzong), an action that Emperor Xuanzong later recognized. Lü, who had been still serving under Geshu at the time Geshu was defeated, fled to Lingwu as well. After the eunuchs Zhu Guanghui (朱光輝) and Li Zunzou (李遵驟) recommended him, Emperor Suzong met him and was impressed with him, and thus made him deputy chief imperial censor (御史中丞, Yushi Zhongcheng), often listening to his advice. After Emperor Suzong moved his headquarters to Fengxiang (鳳翔, in modern Baoji, Shaanxi) in 757, he made Lü the deputy minister of defense (武部侍郎, Wubu Shilang) and further allowed Lü to wear a gold and purple robe, generally reserved for higher-ranking officials. After Emperor Suzong recaptured Chang'an and Luoyang later in 757, Lü was one of the officials, along with Li Xian and Cui Qi (崔器), who adjudicated the cases of former Tang officials who had submitted to Yan as subjects. It was said that both Lü and Cui were harsh while Li Xian was more merciful, and that Lü's harshness brought much disdain for him.

== As chancellor ==
In spring 759, Lü Yin, then still deputy minister of defense, was given the designation Tong Zhongshu Menxia Pingzhangshi (同中書門下平章事), making him a chancellor de facto, and he was also made in charge of the examination bureau of government (門下省, Menxia Sheng) even though he carried no official responsibility at the examination bureau. (This was part of a reorganization of Emperor Suzong's administration, as Emperor Suzong simultaneously also made Li Xian, Li Kui, and Diwu Qi chancellors while removing Miao Jinqing and Wang Yu.) In summer 759, after his mother died, he left public service briefly, but was recalled to the same posts three months later, and was additionally given the office of special taxation emissary (度支使, Duzhi Shi). He was also created the Count of Xuchang and made Huangmen Shilang (黃門侍郎), the deputy head of the examination bureau. In early 760, Emperor Suzong gave him the greater chancellor de facto designation of Tong Zhongshu Menxia Sanpin (同中書門下三品) and awarded him a ceremonial ji (halberd). Lü, believing it to be inappropriate to receive such honors in mourning clothes, took off his mourning clothes—and this drew much criticism from others.

During the time that Lü served as chancellor, he drew further criticism by making his father-in-law Cheng Chubin a deputy minister and brother-in-law Cheng Zhen a junior official. Further, he had a close association with the eunuch Ma Shangyan (馬上言). When Ma received the bribe from a reserve official who sought to be the sheriff of Lantian County (藍田, near Chang'an), he requested Lü to make that person the sheriff of Lantian County. Lü did so. When this was discovered in summer 760, Emperor Suzong, in anger, battered Ma to death and had Ma's subordinates consume his flesh. Lü was not killed, but was removed from his chancellor position, to serve on the staff of Emperor Suzong's crown prince Li Yu instead.

== After serving as chancellor ==
Two months later, Lü Yin was made the secretary general at Jing Prefecture (荊州, roughly modern Jingzhou, Hubei), as well as the military governor of the five surrounding prefectures. Once he was at Jing Prefecture, he requested that Emperor Suzong designate the prefectural capital Jiangling as a special municipality and the southern capital. Emperor Suzong agreed and converted Jing Prefecture into Jiangling Municipality, making Lü its mayor. Further, at Lü's request, he also ordered 3,000 soldiers to be stationed at Jiangling to block off any potential rebellions in the region. Further, he also added seven prefectures to Lü's area of responsibility.

Prior to Lü's arrival, his office was occupied by the general Zhang Weiyi (張惟一). Zhang, however, was often intimidated by his subordinate Chen Xi'ang (陳希昂) -- who controlled his own private army at his home prefecture of Heng Prefecture (near modern Hengyang, Hunan) and ruled it as a private fief. On one occasion, Chen, who had an enmity with his colleague Mou Suijin (牟遂金), took his own soldiers into Zhang's mansion, demanding that Zhang order Mou beheaded. Zhang, in fear, ordered Mou's execution, and thereafter, Chen dominated the affairs at headquarters. When Lü arrived at his post, he initially ingratiated Chen by recommending him for promotion, and then killed him by a surprise attack. Lü was thereafter able to control headquarters.

On another occasion, there had been a sorcerer Shen Taizhi (申泰芝), who ingratiated the powerful eunuch Li Fuguo by using sorcery on Li Fuguo's behalf. Through Li Fuguo's influence, Shen was made a commanding army officer at Dao Prefecture (道州, in modern Yongzhou, Hunan). Shen was corrupt and extorted much wealth from the local non-Han population. Pang Chengding (龐承鼎), the prefect of nearby Tan Prefecture (in modern Changsha, Hunan), had long been angry about Shen's corruption, and on one occasion, when Shen was in Tan Prefecture, Pang apprehended him and seized the ill-gotten gains, and then submitted an accusation against Shen. Both Shen and Pang were taken to Chang'an, and because of Shen's association with Li Fuguo, Li Fuguo cleared him and accused Pang of false accusations. He ordered Lü to investigate. Lü had his subordinate Yan Ying (嚴郢) investigate and submit a report clearing Pang and confirming Shen's guilt. Emperor Suzong, influenced greatly by Li Fuguo, however, ordered Pang executed and Yan exiled. Lü strenuously objected, despite the dangers in doing so, but was unable to save Pang or Yan at that point; this, however, made people much more respectful of Lü, and ultimately, Shen's guilt was shown, and he was executed while Pang was posthumously restored.

While Lü was chancellor, he had a poor relationship with his colleague Li Kui. As Lü gained a good reputation while at Jing Prefecture, Li Kui was displeased. Li Kui therefore proposed that armies under Lü's command be disbanded, arguing that the region did not need soldiers, and also often sent examiners to Lü's region of responsibility, seeking to find Lü's faults. Lü reported this to Emperor Suzong and defended himself. As a result, Li Kui was removed from his chancellor position and demoted to be a prefect. Lü died in 762 and was given posthumous honors.

The New Book of Tang had this commentary about Lü:

When Lü Yin was chancellor, he was not a competent chancellor. Once he went to Jing Prefecture, his orders were proper, and his taxations were appropriate. His governance was characterized by both display of authority and faithfulness, and therefore both soldiers and civilian officials worked hard. Throughout his region, there were no bandits, and the people praised him with songs. Since the Zhide era [(756-758, i.e., since the start of Emperor Suzong's reign] there were tens of regional governors, but none had a better reputation than Lü. Even while he was alive the people of Jing Prefecture built a shrine for him, and a greater one was built by efforts of his subordinates after his death.

While serving at Jing Prefecture, Lü also heard about the talents of the officials Du Hongjian and Yuan Zai and recommended them. Both later became chancellors.
