= Miao Jinqing =

Chinese chancellor

Miao Jinqing (苗晉卿) (685–21 May 765), courtesy name Yuanfu (元輔), formally Duke Wenzhen of Han (韓文貞公), was a Chinese politician during the Tang dynasty, serving as a chancellor during the reigns of Emperor Suzong and Emperor Daizong. He was noted for his peaceful nature, but also noted for his overeagerness to please powerful individuals at court.

== Background ==
Miao Jinqing was born in 685, during the first reign of Emperor Ruizong. His family was from Lu Prefecture (潞州, roughly modern Changzhi, Shanxi) and traced its ancestry to the royal clan of Chu, a state of the Warring States period. His ancestors had been Confucian scholars for generations. His grandfather Miao Kui (苗夔) was known for having refused appointment to civil service. His father Miao Daishu (苗殆庶) did serve as an official, but only reached the office of secretary general of Longmen County (龍門, in modern Yuncheng, Shanxi). Miao Jinqing himself was known for studiousness in his youth, and he was able to pass the imperial examinations, allowing him to enter civil service.

== During Emperor Xuanzong's reign ==
Sometime during the reign of Emperor Ruizong's son Emperor Xuanzong, Miao Jinqing started his official career as the sheriff of Xiuwu County (修武, in modern Jiaozuo, Henan), and then served as the sheriff of Fengxian County (奉先, near the Tang capital Chang'an) – which, given its proximity to Chang'an, was considered a promotion. For the faults of someone he was associated with – the historical accounts were not clear – he was then demoted to be a census officer at Xu Prefecture (徐州, roughly modern Xuzhou, Jiangsu). After his term of service was complete at Xu Prefecture, his performance was judged to be of high rank, and he was made the sheriff of Wannian County (萬年) – one of the two counties making up Chang'an, making the sheriff position, while low rank, a very prestigious position. He later served as Shiyushi (侍御史), a low-level imperial censor, before successively serving as a junior official at the ministries of finance, defense, and civil service affairs. In 735, he was promoted within the civil service affairs ministry to the position of Libu Langzhong (吏部郎中), serving under the deputy ministers. In 736, he and his colleague as Libu Langzhong, Sun Ti (孫逖), were both given additional titles as Zhongshu Sheren (中書舍人) as mid-level officials of the legislative bureau of government (中書省, Zhongshu Sheng). In 739, while still carrying those titles, he became one of the officials in charge of selecting officials for civil service. Miao was said to be peaceful and humble in his character, and when the reserve officials argued with him over their commissions, regardless of how talkative or argumentative they got, he still tolerated their arguments without displeasure. In 741, he was promoted to be deputy minister of civil service affairs (吏部侍郎, Libu Shilang). Overall, he was responsible for selecting officials for five years. It was said that because he was not an exacting supervisor, his subordinates were carrying out misdeeds, including accepting bribes for commissions.

At that time, there was peace in the Tang realm, and it was said that in a typical year, over 10,000 men would arrive at Chang'an to undergo the imperial examinations. Miao's superior, the minister of civil service affairs, was Li Linfu, who also served as chancellor and concentrated that office, and the ministry was effectively entrusted to Miao and his colleague as deputy minister, Song Yao (宋遙). Because there were so many examinees, Emperor Xuanzong often also selected officials from other ministries to assist Miao and Song, hoping that by doing so the examination process could be fair. In 743, while Miao and Song were still in charge, there was a major scandal in the examination process. That year, Zhang Shi (張奭), the son of the deputy chief imperial censor, Zhang Yi (張倚), was one of the examinees. Miao and Song knew that Zhang Yi was then well-trusted by Emperor Xuanzong and wanted to ingratiate him. When they selected 64 examinees who passed the examinations and ranked them, therefore, they ranked Zhang Shi the highest. It was well known among the other examinees, however, that Zhang Shi never studied diligently, and there was much murmur. A former county magistrate, Su Xiaoyun (蘇孝慍), heard about this, and he reported this to his former superior, the general An Lushan, who then was much favored by Emperor Xuanzong. An reported this to Emperor Xuanzong. Emperor Xuanzong therefore gathered the 64 passing examinees and personally tested them. Only less than 20% of the examinees were able to satisfy Emperor Xuanzong, and in particular, Zhang Shi, when given the questions by Emperor Xuanzong, was not able to write a single character on his examination sheet. Emperor Xuanzong, in anger, demoted Miao, Song, and Zhang Yi all to be commandery governors — in Miao's case, to be the governor of Ankang Commandery (安康, roughly modern Ankang, Shaanxi).

In 744, Miao was moved to be the governor of Wei Commandery (魏郡, roughly modern Handan, Hebei), as well as the surveyor of Hebei Circuit (河北, i.e., roughly modern Hebei). He served there for three years and was said to have governed Wei Commandery well. After three years, he was summoned back to Chang'an, and, at his request, Emperor Xuanzong allowed him to visit his home county, Huguan County (壺關), on the way. When he arrived at Huguan, he got off his horse and began to walk as soon as he spotted the gates to the county seat. His attendant stated to him, "You, Governor, are highly honored and known for your virtues, and you should not take yourself lightly." Miao responded:

According to the Book of Rites, "One should get off his horse when he is to visit a government office." Moreover, this is the county where my parents lived. I should pay respect to it. Why speak further?

Once Miao arrived at Huguan, he spent several days inviting the people of the county to feasts and also donated a major part of his salary to serve as an education fund for the young men. Soon thereafter, he was made the governor of Hedong Commandery (河東, roughly modern Yuncheng, Shanxi), as well as the surveyor of Hedong Circuit (also 河東, but referring to the entire circuit, headquartered in modern Taiyuan, Shanxi). He was later moved to serve as governor of Fufeng Commandery (扶風, roughly modern Baoji, Shaanxi) and created the Baron of Gaoping. He later served as the minister of public works (工部尚書, Gongbu Shangshu) and the official in charge of the eastern capital Luoyang. After that tour of duty, he was summoned back to Chang'an to serve as the minister of justice (憲部尚書, Xianbu Shangshu) as well as Shangshu Zuo Cheng (尚書左丞), one of the secretaries general of the examination bureau (尚書省, Shangshu Sheng).

In 755, when An rebelled at Fanyang Circuit (范陽, headquartered in modern Beijing) and quickly captured Luoyang, the governor of the key Shan Commandery (陝郡, roughly modern Sanmenxia, Henan), abandoned his post without defending it. The powerful chancellor Yang Guozhong, who disliked Miao, wanted to use this as an opportunity to get Miao out of Chang'an, and therefore suggested that as Miao was a senior official, he would be a good choice to defend Shan. Emperor Xuanzong agreed and commissioned Miao as the governor of Shan as well as the commander of the forces in the region. Miao, who was then 70 years old and who did not want to undertake this military duty, visited Emperor Xuanzong to decline this commission on account of old age, and in doing so offended Emperor Xuanzong. Emperor Xuanzong thus removed him from his office and made him retire.

== During Emperor Suzong's reign ==
In 756, with forces of An Lushan's new state of Yan approaching Chang'an, Emperor Xuanzong fled Chang'an toward Chengdu, without taking most members of his court. Many officials surrendered to Yan forces. Miao Jinqing did not do so, but instead fled into a valley and eventually to Ankang Commandery. Meanwhile, Emperor Xuanzong's son and crown prince Li Heng also did not follow Emperor Xuanzong but instead fled to Lingwu, where he was proclaimed emperor (as Emperor Suzong), an act later recognized by Emperor Xuanzong, who took the title of Taishang Huang (retired emperor). As Tang forces staged their counterattack in 757, Emperor Suzong advanced from Lingwu to Fengxiang (鳳翔, i.e., the capital of Fufeng Commandery). He summoned Miao to his court and made Miao Zuo Xiang (左相) – the head of the examination bureau (門下省, Menxia Sheng) and a post considered one for a chancellor. He often consulted Miao on important affairs of state. Later in the year, after Tang forces recaptured Chang'an and Luoyang, Miao continued to serve as chancellor and the head of the examination bureau — now retitled Shizhong (侍中). He was also created the Duke of Han. Miao repeatedly requested retirement, and in 759, as a part of Emperor Suzong's reorganization of his chancellors, he removed Miao and his colleague Wang Yu from their chancellor positions, replacing them with Lü Yin, Li Xian, and Li Kui. Emperor Suzong gave Miao the post of Taizi Taifu (太子太傅) – senior advisor to Emperor Suzong's crown prince Li Yu. In 760, however, Emperor Suzong again made Miao Shizhong, returning him to the rank of chancellors.

The Old Book of Tang had this to say about Miao's style of governance:

Miao Jinqing was gracious, forgiving, uncorrupt, and careful. When he governed, he cared about only the major points and did not care about minor faults. He left marks of grace wherever he went, and the people of Wei Commandery missed him so greatly that they erected a monument for him. When he served as chancellor, he was careful and did not dare to offend anyone. He was dexterous, understanding, and quickly comprehended the affairs presented to him. He carefully protected himself and was able to use his intelligence to stay safe. Those who commented about him compared to Hu Guang [(胡廣, a Han dynasty prime minister who was known for his carefulness)].

In 762, Emperor Xuanzong died. Emperor Suzong, who was already ill, commissioned Miao to serve as regent for three days while he mourned. After Emperor Suzong himself died soon thereafter, Li Yu took the throne as Emperor Daizong but wanted Miao to serve as regent again briefly. This time, Miao declined, citing his own old age and his belief that having a regent was inappropriate given the circumstances, and Emperor Daizong agreed.

== During Emperor Daizong's reign ==
In his old age, Miao Jinqing continued to serve as chancellor. He requested that he be allowed to report to the office of chancellors only every other day, and Emperor Daizong agreed – and further permitted Miao to enter the office in a litter. He also met Miao regularly at Yanying Hall (延英殿) – a mode which set a precedent for later emperors and later ailing chancellors.

In 763, Tibetan, or Tubo, forces launched a surprise attack on Chang'an, and Emperor Daizong was forced to flee east. Miao, being ill, could not follow Emperor Daizong, and Tibetan forces, which proclaimed Emperor Daizong's second cousin Li Chenghong the Prince of Guangwu the Emperor of Tang, went to Miao's mansion to try to force him to serve Li Chenghong. Miao refused to cooperate and remained silent. Tibetan forces did not dare to kill him and left him alone. Later in the year, after Emperor Daizong's forces were able to force Tibetan forces to leave Chang'an and remove Li Chenghong, allowing Emperor Daizong's return, Miao was given the exceedingly highly honored title of Taifu (太傅), but was removed from his chancellor position. He died in May 765 and was buried with great honors. Initially, the officials responsible for posthumous names proposed for him the posthumous name of Yixian (懿獻, meaning "benevolent and wise"). At that time, the most powerful figure at court was the chancellor Yuan Zai, who had previously served under Miao and was grateful to Miao, and he ordered the officials to change the proposal to the more honored Wenzhen (文貞, meaning, "civil and virtuous"). In 772, Emperor Daizong ordered that Miao be worshipped with Emperor Suzong at Emperor Suzong's temple.

== Notes and references ==
- Old Book of Tang, vol. 113.
- New Book of Tang, vol. 140.
- Zizhi Tongjian, vols. 215, 219, 221, 222, 223.
