= Gao Chongwen =

Chinese general

Gao Chongwen (Chinese: 高崇文; 746–809), formally Prince Weiwu of Nanping (南平威武王), was a Chinese military general, monarch, and politician during the Tang dynasty, most well known for his defeat of the warlord Liu Pi.

== Background ==
Gao Chongwen was born in 746, during the reign of Emperor Xuanzong. His ancestors were originally from Bohai Commandery (渤海郡, in modern Cangzhou, Hebei), but after relocating to Tang dynasty's You Prefecture (幽州, in modern Beijing), did not move for seven generations. He himself was born at You Prefecture, and was said to be simple, tolerant, and quiet. In his youth, he served in the army of Pinglu Circuit (平盧, originally headquartered in modern Chaoyang, Liaoning but later moved to Weifang, Shandong).

== During Emperor Dezong's reign ==
During the Zhenyuan era (785-805) of Emperor Xuanzong's great-grandson Emperor Dezong, Gao Chongwen served under the general Han Quanyi (韓全義) in defending Changwu Castle (長武城, in modern Pingliang, Gansu) against Tufan. In summer 789, when a Tufan army, 30,000 in strength, attacked Ning Prefecture (寧州, in modern Qingyang, Gansu), Gao led 3,000 men in an effort to relieve Ning Prefecture, and he battled Tufan forces at Futang Plains (佛堂原, probably near Ning Prefecture), defeating them and killing more than half of the Tufan army. For this accomplishment, Gao was created the Prince of Bohai. Later, on an occasion when Han went to Chang'an to pay homage to Emperor Dezong, Gao served as acting military governor. In 798, he was promoted to be the commander of Changwu Castle. It was said that he gathered food and exercised the soldiers, leading to greater fighting capabilities for his men.

== During Emperor Xianzong's reign ==
=== Campaign against Liu Pi ===
In spring 806, Liu Pi, who had already been in control of Xichuan Circuit (西川, headquartered in modern Chengdu, Sichuan), demanded that then-ruling Emperor Xianzong (Emperor Dezong's grandson) give him control over two neighboring circuits — Dongchuan (東川, headquartered in modern Mianyang, Sichuan) and Shannan West (山南西道, headquartered in modern Hanzhong, Shaanxi) as well. When Emperor Xianzong refused, Liu rose against imperial authority and attacked Dongchuan, intending to seize it. Many imperial officials were apprehensive about attacking Liu because Xichuan was well-fortified geographically, but the chancellor Du Huangchang advocated a campaign against Liu and recommended Gao Chongwen, stating that he knew that Gao was brave and intelligent. Emperor Xianzong agreed and commissioned Gao as the Jiedushi (usually the military governor of a circuit, but in this case an army commander) of the Left Shence Army (左神策軍), commanding the forward troops against Liu, assisted by Li Yuanyi (李元奕) and Yan Li (嚴礪). It was said that at the time, many senior generals were expecting themselves to be put in charge in the operation against Liu, and that when Gao was announced as the commander, many were surprised. It was also said that he was apprehensive of another general, Liu Yong (劉澭), the military governor of Baoyi Circuit (保義, headquartered in modern Baoji, Shaanxi), and that Du motivated Gao on the campaign by warning him that if he were not successful, Liu Yong would be commissioned to replace him.

It was said that as soon as Gao received the commission, both he and Li immediately headed toward Zi Prefecture (梓州), the capital prefecture of Dongchuan, which Liu Pi had put under siege. While passing through Xingyuan Municipality (興元), the capital of Shannan West, there was a soldier who got angry at a restaurant and destroyed the chopsticks he was using; Gao immediately put him to death to maintain discipline.

By the time that Gao reached Zi Prefecture, it had fallen, and Liu had taken the military governor of Dongchuan, Li Kang (李康), captive. With Gao arriving at Zi, Liu's officer Xing Ci (邢泚), who had occupied Zi, withdrew. Liu sent Li Kang to Gao and asked for Gao to intercede for him for Emperor Xianzong's forgiveness; however, Gao executed Li Kang, citing Li Kang's failure in battling Liu. At the recommendation of Wei Dan (韋丹), whom Emperor Xianzong had named as the new military governor of Dongchuan, Emperor Xianzong made Gao the deputy military governor of Dongchuan and acting military governor, so that his army can be better supplied directly.

Meanwhile, Liu constructed eight defensive fences at Lutou Pass (鹿頭關, in modern Deyang, Sichuan) to resist Gao. By summer 806, however, Gao was defeating him in eight straight battles and approaching Lutou Pass. Yan was also defeating Liu's other troops. As Gao was attacking Lutou Pass, the general Adie Guangyan circled around the pass and cut off its supply route, and Lutou Pass fell after Liu's officers Li Wenyue (李文悅) and Qiu Liangfu (仇良輔) surrendered. Gao captured Liu's son-in-law Su Jiang (蘇疆) and headed straight for Xichuan's capital Chengdu. On November 5, Chengdu fell. Liu and his strategist Lu Wenruo (盧文若) tried to flee to Tufan, but soldiers that Gao sent after them intercepted them. Liu was captured, while Lu committed suicide. It was said that Gao maintained military discipline, and that the people of Chengdu were not at all disturbed. He executed Xing and another officer of Liu's, Shen Yan (沈衍), but spared all of Liu's other subordinates. When it was suggested to him that he offer Liu's two beautiful concubines to Emperor Xianzong, he believed that doing so for imperial favor was improper; instead, he gave them to two of his officers who were not married.

=== After campaign against Liu Pi ===
Emperor Xianzong, after reallocating six prefectures from Xichuan to Dongchuan, made Gao Chongwen the military governor of Xichuan, the mayor of Chengdu, and acting Sikong (司空, one of the Three Excellencies). He also created Gao the Prince of Nanping and ordered that a commemorative text of Gao's victory be engraved at Lutou.

It was said that as Gao was illiterate, he disliked the frequent paperwork that was involved in overseeing the prosperous city of Chengdu, and he often requested to be transferred to a border region. In 807, Emperor Xianzong had the chancellor Wu Yuanheng replace him, and moved him to Binning Circuit (邠寧, headquartered in modern Xianyang, Shaanxi). Emperor Xianzong also made him the overall commander of the troops west of the capital Chang'an and gave him the honorary chancellor title of Tong Zhongshu Menxia Pingzhangshi (同中書門下平章事). It was said that because of Gao's achievements, he became arrogant and wasteful, and when he left Chengdu, he took much of the wealth of the region with him. Because he was not familiar with the rituals at the imperial court, Emperor Xianzong exempted him from the usual custom of first paying homage to the emperor before heading to a new assignment, ordering instead that he be allowed to head directly to Binning.

It was said that during the time that Gao was at Binning, he repaired and strengthened the defenses. He died in 809 and was given posthumous honors. He was later enshrined at the imperial temple with Emperor Xianzong. His son Gao Chengjian (高承簡) and grandson Gao Pian also later served as major generals.

== Notes and references ==
- Old Book of Tang, vol. 151.
- New Book of Tang, vol. 170.
- Zizhi Tongjian, vol. 237.
