= Zhao Zongru =

Chinese chancellor

Zhao Zongru (趙宗儒; 746 – October 18, 832), courtesy name Bingwen (秉文), was an official of the Chinese Tang dynasty who served as a chancellor during the reign of Emperor Dezong—and then served under five more descendants of Emperor Dezong's: his son Emperor Shunzong, his grandson Emperor Xianzong, his great-grandson Emperor Muzong, his great-great-grandsons Emperor Jingzong and Emperor Wenzong.

== Background ==
Zhao Zongru was born in 746, during the reign of Emperor Xuanzong. His family was from Deng Prefecture (鄧州, in modern Nanyang, Henan) and traced its ancestry to the Northern Wei general Zhao Tong (趙彤). Other male-line ancestors of Zhao Zongru's served as officials under the Northern Wei, Sui dynasty, and Tang dynasty, including his father Zhao Hua (趙驊).

== Service under Emperor Dezong ==
Zhao Zongru passed the imperial examinations and was made a scribe at Hongwen Pavilion (弘文館). He served there for over a year, and, because his writing skills were considered excellent, was made the treasurer at Luhun County (陸渾, in modern Luoyang, Henan). Just several months later, he was recalled to the capital Chang'an to serve as You Shiyi (右拾遺), a low-level consultant at the legislative bureau of government (中書省, Zhongshu Sheng), as well as an imperial scholar. On the same day that the received these commissions, his father Zhao Hua was promoted to be the deputy director of the Palace Library, and it was said that their commissions were named the same day because Emperor Xuanzong's great-grandson Emperor Dezong, who was then emperor, wanted to honor their household. In 783, Zhao Zongru was made Tuntian Yuanwailang (屯田員外郎), a low-level official at the ministry of public works (工部, Gongbu), and continued to serve as imperial scholar as well. After his father Zhao Hua died later that year or shortly thereafter when fleeing Chang'an in light of Zhu Ci's rebellion (which also caused Emperor Dezong to flee), Zhao Zongru left public service to observe a mourning period for his father. After the mourning period was over, he returned to public service and successively served as Simen Yuanwailang (司門員外郎), a low-level official at the ministry of justice (刑部, Xingbu) and Sixun Yuanwailang (司勳員外廊), a low-level official at the ministry of civil service affairs (吏部, Libu).

In 790, Emperor Dezong put Zhao in charge of evaluating the officials' performance, and it was said that Zhao carried out this task diligently and fairly. Emperor Dezong approved of his actions and made him Kaogong Langzhong (考功郎中), a supervisorial official at the ministry of civil service affairs. He later left public service again to observe a mourning period for his mother, and after the mourning period was over was made Libu Langzhong (吏部郎中), also a supervisorial post at the ministry of civil service affairs. In 795, he was made an imperial attendant (給事中, Jishizhong). In 796, he was made chancellor with the designation Tong Zhongshu Menxia Pingzhangshi (同中書門下平章事), along with Cui Sun. Virtually nothing is recorded in history about his acts as chancellor, however, and in 798 he was removed from the post and made a staff member of Emperor Dezong's crown prince Li Song.

After Zhao's removal as chancellor, it was said that he was careful in his action and all he did was attend imperial meetings when called. Emperor Dezong approved of his carefulness, and in 804 made him the deputy minister of civil service affairs (吏部侍郎, Libu Shilang). When he met Zhao, he stated: "I know that you, Lord, have closed your doors for six years, and therefore decided to give you this office. Do you still remember how you were given commissions on the same day as my old subject ([i.e., Zhao Hua])?" Zhao was so touched that he wept prostrate.

== Service under Emperors Shunzong and Xianzong ==
In 805, Emperor Dezong died, and Li Song succeeded him (as Emperor Shunzong). Emperor Shunzong put Zhao Zongru in charge of drafting the mourning text for Emperor Dezong.

Early in the Yuanhe (806–820) era of Emperor Shunzong's son Emperor Xianzong, Zhao was made the defender of the eastern capital Luoyang. He was later recalled to serve, successively, as the minister of rites (禮部尚書, Lǐbu Shangshu) and then minister of census (戶部尚書, Hubu Shangshu). He was thereafter made the military governor (Jiedushi) of Jingnan Circuit (荊南, headquartered in modern Jingzhou, Hubei) as well as the mayor of its capital Jiangling Municipality (江陵). While serving there, he released 2,000 soldiers who were not needed from their commissions. In 811, he was recalled serving as the minister of justice (刑部尚書, Xingbu Shangshu). In 813, he was made the military governor of Shannan West Circuit (山南西道, headquartered in modern Hanzhong, Shaanxi) as well as the mayor of its capital Xingyuan Municipality (興元). In 814, he was recalled to serve as chief imperial censor (御史大夫, Yushi Daifu), but soon was made the military governor of Hezhong Circuit (河中, headquartered in modern Yuncheng, Shanxi) as well as the mayor of its capital Hezhong Municipality. While there, there was an occasion when he was accused of wrongly spending money allocated for soldiers' salaries, and he was fined one month's worth of his own salary. In 816, he was recalled serving as the minister of defense (兵部尚書, Bingbu Shangshu). Shortly after, he was made an advisor to Emperor Xianzong's crown prince Li Heng but was also acting minister of civil service affairs (吏部尚書, Lìbu Shangshu, note different tone than the minister of rites). In 819, he became full minister of civil service affairs.

== Service under Emperors Muzong, Jingzong, and Wenzong ==
After Emperor Xianzong died in 820 and Li Heng succeeded him (as Emperor Muzong), Emperor Muzong, as he was still in the mourning period for Emperor Xianzong, requested that the officials from the executive bureau (尚書省, Shangshu Sheng) be in charge presiding over the imperial examinations, rather than having him personally do so. Zhao Zongru opposed on the basis that this was against tradition and that there was no time to revise the examination method before the examinees would be forced to leave the capital. Emperor Muzong agreed. Thereafter, Zhao was again made an advisor to the crown prince, but also was acting as minister of worship (太常卿, Taichang Qing). In 821, he was made acting You Pushe (右僕射), one of the heads of the executive bureau, as well as minister of worship. Part of his responsibilities included supervising a musical corps known as the Lion Orchestra (師子樂, Shizi Yue), which was ordinarily not used except for the solemn imperial meetings, and which used decorations of five different colors, representing the five directions (including center). With Emperor Muzong being young and frivolous, giving many authorities to his musicians, the eunuchs who directed the palace musical corps demanded that the five-colored decorations be given to the palace musical corps. Zhao did not dare to refuse, but reported this to the chancellors. The chancellors, however, felt that it was Zhao's responsibility to refuse this improper demand, and believing Zhao to be cowardly, had him removed and serve only as advisor to the crown prince.

In 825, when Emperor Muzong's son Emperor Jingzong was emperor, Zhao was made a senior advisor to the crown prince. When Emperor Jingzong died in 826 and was succeeded by his brother Emperor Wenzong, Zhao was made the director of Daming Palace (大明宮). In 830, Emperor Wenzong made him acting Sikong (司空, one of the Three Excellencies) and senior advisor to the crown prince. Emperor Wenzong summoned him and asked him for advice, and he responded, "The way of Emperor Yao and Emperor Shun [(two mythical emperors known for their benevolent rule)] were based on kindness and frugality. I wish that Your Imperial Majesty would keep that in mind." Emperor Wenzong appreciated the advice. In 831, when the chancellor Song Shenxi was falsely accused of treason, Emperor Wenzong convened a group of senior officials to discuss potential punishments. Zhao was one of the senior officials summoned, but on account of his old age, Emperor Wenzong ordered that he not be required to bow. Soon thereafter, Zhao requested to retire, and in 832, Emperor Wenzong approved of the retirement after conferring on him the full Sikong status. Zhao died in the fall of 832 and was posthumously honored. He was remembered for having come to prominence due to his literary abilities, having served three terms as military governor, and having been in charge of selecting officials eight times. However, he was criticized for being not careful in the rites and paying too much unnecessary attention to details of life.

== Notes and references ==
- Old Book of Tang, vol. 167.
- New Book of Tang, vol. 151.
- Zizhi Tongjian, vol. 235.
