= Li Xian (chancellor) =

Chancellor of the Tang Dynasty
- Reign: 759
- Predecessor: Lü Yin
- Successor: Li Kui
- Reign: 763–764
- Predecessor: Li Kuo
- Successor: Wang Jin
- Born: 709
- Died: 766 (aged 56–57)
- Father: Li Yi
- Occupation: Politician

Li Xian (Chinese: 李峴; pinyin: Lǐ Xiàn; 709–766), formally the Duke of Liang (梁公, Liáng Gōng), was a Chinese politician of the Tang dynasty, serving as a chancellor during the reigns of Emperor Suzong and Emperor Daizong. He was known for his willingness to stand up against the powerful eunuch Li Fuguo and for his mercy toward other officials who had become collaborators with the rebel Yan regime.

== Background ==
Li Xian was born in 709, during the reign of Emperor Zhongzong. He was a member of Tang dynasty's imperial Li clan – his great-grandfather Li Ke the Prince of Wu was a son of Tang's second emperor Emperor Taizong, who was also Emperor Zhongzong's grandfather. Li Xian's grandfather Li Kun (李琨) served as a prefectural prefect and was posthumously honored with the title of Prince of Wu as well. Li Xian's father Li Hui (李褘) the Prince of Xin'an was a well-known general early in the reign of Emperor Zhongzong's nephew Emperor Xuanzong. Li Xian had two older brothers, Li Heng (李峘) and Li Yi (李嶧), both of whom served as officials as well.

== During Emperor Xuanzong's reign ==
It was said that Li Xian was charitable and humble, willing to meet capable people of lower social stations, and that he showed abilities to be an official in his youth. Because of his heritage, he was able to join the civil service, and he eventually served as the magistrate of Gaoling County (高陵, in modern Xi'an, Shaanxi), near the capital Chang'an. Due to his good performance at Gaoling, he was then made the magistrate of Wannian County (萬年), one of the two counties making up the city of Chang'an. He then successively served as the deputy mayor of Henan Municipality (河南, i.e., the eastern capital Luoyang), the governor of Wei Commandery (魏郡, roughly modern Handan, Hebei), a general of the imperial guards, the director of palace construction (將作監, Jiangzuo Jian), and eventually the mayor of Jingzhao Municipality (京兆, i.e., Chang'an). Wherever he went he served well. In 754, while Li Xian was serving as the mayor of Jingzhao, the region suffered some 60 days of rain, causing much flooding. The powerful chancellor Yang Guozhong, who resented Li Xian for not flattering him, took this opportunity to blame Li Xian for the floods (i.e., that Li Xian must have brought divine displeasure) and had him demoted to be the governor of Changsha Commandery. The populace, which missed his governance, wrote a song that included the words, "If you want the grain price to fall, bring Li Xian back."

== During Emperor Suzong's reign ==
In 755, the general An Lushan rebelled at Fanyang Circuit (范陽, headquartered in modern Beijing), and by 756, forces of his new Yan state were approaching Chang'an, forcing Emperor Xuanzong to flee toward Chengdu. Emperor Xuanzong's son and crown prince Li Heng (note different character than Li Xian's brother) did not follow Emperor Xuanzong on the trek to Chengdu, but instead fled to Lingwu, where he was declared emperor (as Emperor Suzong) – an act that Emperor Xuanzong recognized when he heard the news. After Emperor Suzong's ascension but before Emperor Xuanzong received the news, however, Emperor Xuanzong made a number of commissions of Emperor Suzong and his other sons, giving them different regions of responsibility in the realm, and one of Emperor Suzong's younger brothers, Li Lin the Prince of Yong, was given the areas of Shannan East (山南東道, headquartered in modern Xiangfan, Hubei), Lingnan (headquartered in modern Guangzhou, Guangdong), Qianzhong (黔中, headquartered in modern Chongqing), and Jiangnan West (江南西道, headquartered in modern Nanchang, Jiangxi) Circuits, with Dou Shao (竇紹) and Li Xian as his assistants, and his headquarters set at Jiangling. After Li Lin reported to his post, however, it became clear that Li Lin intended to rule the area as his own realm independent from Emperors Xuanzong and Suzong, and he further intended to incorporate other regions south of the Yangtze River into his private realm. Li Xian, realizing this, claimed an illness and resigned, but instead reported to Emperor Suzong's court, where he conferred with Emperor Suzong and the official Gao Shi (高適) on strategies to defeat Li Lin. (Soon, when Li Lin openly rebelled, he was defeated by the generals Li Xian (李銑, note different character) and Li Chengshi (李成式), and was ultimately captured and executed by the general Huangfu Shen (皇甫侁).)

Meanwhile, Emperor Suzong made Li Xian the governor of Fufeng Commandery (扶風, roughly modern Baoji, Shaanxi) – where Emperor Suzong was at the time, so effectively the mayor of the capital again – as well as chief imperial censor (御史大夫, Yushi Daifu). After Emperor Suzong recaptured Chang'an in 757, he made Li Xian the mayor of Jingzhao Municipality again and created him the Duke of Liang, making him of the same rank as his older brother Li Heng, who had already been created the Duke of Zhao, as the eldest son of a prince. After a joint Tang and Huige force commanded by Emperor Suzong's son Li Chu the Prince of Chu recaptured Luoyang as well, Li Xian, then also carrying the title of minister of rites (禮部尚書, Libu Shangshu), along with his colleagues Lü Yin and Cui Qi (崔器), were put in charge of judging the cases against former Tang officials who had surrendered to and served the Yan regime. It was said that Lü and Cui were harsh, but Li Xian was merciful and gained a good reputation from his judgments. In late 757, after they had judged most of the cases, Lü and Cui proposed that those former officials who had served Yan should all be put to death. Li Xian pointed out that the rebellion had not entirely been put down yet, and further, some officials were coerced into serving Yan, and should be treated differently from those who openly embraced Yan causes. At Li Xian's suggestion, Emperor Suzong divided the punishment for those former Tang officials into six grades, with the punishments being beheading, forced suicide, caning, exile, and demotion, respectively.

In spring 759, as a part of reorganization of his chancellors, Emperor Suzong removed Miao Jinqing and Wang Yu as chancellors, and replaced them with Lü, Li Xian, Li Kui, and Diwu Qi, giving all of them the de facto chancellor designations Tong Zhongshu Menxia Pingzhangshi (同中書門下平章事). Li Xian was also given the post of Zhongshu Shilang (中書侍郎), the deputy head of the executive bureau of government (中書省, Zhongshu Sheng). Emperor Suzong trusted Li Xian the most, and Li Xian was the most senior among the chancellors, and therefore Li Xian made the most decisions, drawing resentment from Lü. At that time, the powerful eunuch Li Fuguo and the secret police agents that he employed were able to roam through Chang'an, doing whatever they wished in the emperor's name with impunity. At Li Xian's suggestion, Emperor Suzong suspended the secret police agents' powers, causing LI Fuguo to resent Li Xian as well. Soon, the issue came to a head when a horse trainer inside the palace at Fengxiang Municipality (i.e., the former Fufeng Commandery) committed robbery and was captured and executed by the sheriff of Tianxing County (天興, in modern Baoji) Xie Yifu (謝夷甫). The trainer's wife protested her husband's innocence to Li Fuguo, who had previously served in the same role and therefore was sympathetic. Li Fuguo thus ordered reinvestigations, which were carried out by the officials Sun Ying (孫鎣), Cui Boyang (崔伯陽), Li Ye (李曄), and Quan Xian (權獻) – all of whom agreed that Xie's actions were proper. However, neither the wife nor Li Fuguo was satisfied, and Li Fuguo ordered the imperial censor Mao Ruoxu (毛若虛) to reinvestigate, and Mao, wanting to flatter Li Fuguo, concluded that Xie wrongly executed the trainer. Cui, who was Mao's superior, in anger, wanted to file an accusation against Mao, but Mao instead met with Emperor Suzong first and protested his innocence. When Cui did submit his accusation that Mao was flattering Li Fuguo, Emperor Suzong exiled Cui, Quan, Li Ye, and Yan Xiang (嚴向) the mayor of Fengxiang Municipality, while Sun was not only exiled but further reduced to commoner rank. Li Xian submitted a defense of Cui, and Emperor Suzong, believed that Li Xian was engaged in factionalism, was instead removed from his chancellor post and demoted to be the governor of Shu Prefecture (蜀州, in modern Chengdu).

== During Emperor Daizong's reign ==
Emperor Suzong died in 762 and was succeeded by Li Chu (whose name had been changed to Li Yu by that point) (as Emperor Daizong). Emperor Daizong made Li Xian the military governor (jiedushi) of Jingnan Circuit (荊南, headquartered in modern Jingzhou, Hubei) and put him in charge of selecting officials from the Yangtze and Huai River regions. He later recalled Li Xian to serve as the minister of rites and the minister of imperial clan affairs (宗正卿, Zongzheng Qing). In 763, after a surprise attack by the Tibetan Empire forced Emperor Daizong to flee Chang'an to Shan Prefecture (陝州, in modern Sanmenxia, Henan), Li Xian followed Emperor Daizong to Shan Prefecture as well and, upon Emperor Daizong's return to Chang'an, was made Huangmen Shilang (黃門侍郎) — the deputy head of the examination bureau (門下省, Menxia Sheng) — and chancellor again with the designation Tong Zhongshu Menxia Pingzhangshi. It was said that earlier regulations did not permit chancellors to receive guests at the Hall of Chancellors (政事堂, Zhengshi Tang), but in order to placate eunuchs, the chancellor Yuan Zai set up mats at the Hall of Chancellors to facilitate visiting eunuchs. Li Xian ordered that the mats be removed. In 764, with eunuchs resentful of him – believing that he was responsible for the removal of the powerful eunuch Cheng Yuanzhen – he was removed from his chancellor post and made a staff member of Emperor Suzong's crown prince Li Kuo, and soon sent to Hong Prefecture (洪州, in modern Nanchang, Jiangxi) to be responsible again for selecting officials from the Yangtze and Huai regions. In 765, he was made the prefect of Qu Prefecture (衢州, roughly modern Quzhou, Zhejiang). He died in summer 766.

== Notes and references ==
- Old Book of Tang, vol. 112.
- New Book of Tang, vol. 131.
- Zizhi Tongjian, vols. 217, 218, 219, 220, 221, 223.
