= Five Oxen =

- 五牛圖 (Chinese)
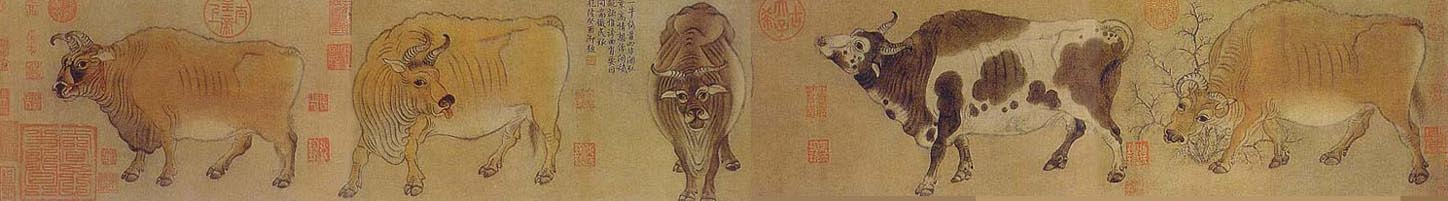
- A close-up on the Five Oxen by Han Huang, from the Palace Museum collection
- Artist: Han Huang
- Year: 723–787
- Type: Handscroll
- Medium: Ink and color on paper
- Location: Palace Museum, Beijing, China

The Five Oxen by Han Huang, the full scroll, located in the Palace Museum

The Five Oxen (traditional Chinese: 五牛圖; simplified Chinese: 五牛图) or Wuniu tu, is a hand scroll painting on paper by Han Huang (723 – 787), a high-ranking official of the Tang dynasty. It is celebrated as one of the oldest surviving paper scroll paintings of note by an identified artist in Chinese art history, and it is in the permanent collection of the Palace Museum in Beijing.

The painting was owned, written about, and commented by many notable figures throughout history, including Emperor Gaozong of Song, Emperor Huizong of Song, and artists like Zhao Mengfu, Xiang Yuanbian and Jin Nong, and then was later owned by the Qianlong Emperor (presented to him on his birthday in 1752). The painting has the seals, inscriptions and colophons of 14 renowned artists.

== Historical reception ==
The painting was positively received by numerous well-known figures, such as the Tang dynasty writer Zhu Jingyuan (朱景元). In his 9th century text Tangchao Minghua Lu (唐朝名畫錄; written approximately from 840 to 843), Zhu writes "Duke Jin [Han Huang] was able to master their [animals'] subtlety ... it is above the finest of all works." Lu You of the Southern Song dynasty writes in his Weinan Wenji (渭南文集) that Han's masterful oxen painting had reminded him of the peaceful rural life that he had "lost all contact with" after taking a position in the government.

Zhao Mengfu of the Yuan dynasty describes the painting as "possessing a spirit that is unyielding. It is a masterpiece rarely seen in the world." Zhu Yizun of the early Qing dynasty, in his book Pushu tingji (曝書亭集), writes of the Five Oxen "this masterpiece stands as a brilliant testament to artistic genius and its miraculous survival through time." Jin Nong writes "the more one gazes upon this painting, the more its wonders unfold; it is, in truth, a work of sublime genius."
