= Liu Pi (official) =

Liu Pi (劉闢) (died December 12, 806), courtesy name Taichu (太初), was a Chinese military general, poet, politician, and rebel during the Tang dynasty. Early in the reign of Emperor Xianzong, he resisted imperial authority at Xichuan Circuit (西川, headquartered in modern Chengdu, Sichuan), and was defeated by imperial forces commanded by Gao Chongwen and executed.

== Background and service under Wei Gao ==
It is not known when Liu Pi was born. During the middle of Emperor Dezong's Zhenyuan era (785-805), Liu passed the imperial examinations in the class of those who used language grandly. He was subsequently invited by Wei Gao, then the military governor (Jiedushi) of Xichuan Circuit to serve on Wei's staff. He was eventually promoted to be Zhidu Fushi (支度副使) — Wei's deputy in Wei's capacity as director of military supplies for Xichuan Circuit. It was in this capacity that, in 805, after Emperor Dezong's death and succession by Emperor Shunzong, Wei sent him to the capital Chang'an — to make contact with one of Emperor Shunzong's favorite officials, Wang Shuwen. He informed Wang that Wei wanted to control two neighboring circuits — Dongchuan (東川, headquartered in modern Mianyang, Sichuan) and Shannan West (山南西道, headquartered in modern Hanzhong, Shaanxi) as well, stating to Wang:

The Taiwei [(i.e., Wei)] sent me, Liu Pi, to show his good faith to you, Lord. If you give him the Three Chuans [(i.e., Xichuan, Dongchuan, and Shannan West)], he will assist you to his death. If you do not, he will repay you in other manners.

Wang, in anger, wanted to execute Liu, but was stopped by the chancellor Wei Zhiyi. When Wang subsequently exiled another regional staff member, Yang Shi'e (羊士諤), who was also in Chang'an to make demands for his supervisor, Liu became fearful and fled back to Xichuan. Subsequently, Wei submitted a petition to Emperor Shunzong, who was then seriously ill, condemning Wang and his associates, causing much apprehension among Wang and his associates. Wang lost power shortly after, and, later in the year, Emperor Shunzong yielded the throne to his son Li Chun the Crown Prince (as Emperor Xianzong).

== As acting military governor and rebel ==
In fall 805, Wei Gao died, and Liu Pi claimed the title of acting military governor. He had his subordinates submit petitions on his behalf, asking to be made military governor. Emperor Xianzong initially refused and commissioned the chancellor Yuan Zi as the comforter of the three circuits, and then as military governor of Xichuan. He ordered Liu to return to Chang'an to serve as imperial attendant (給事中, Jishizhong). Liu refused and prepared his forces to resist Yuan. Yuan, in fear of the strength of Liu's forces, did not dare to advance. Emperor Xianzong, in anger, exiled Yuan. However, as he was new to the throne and he believed himself to have insufficient strength to overpower Liu at this point, he formally made Liu the deputy military governor and acting military governor.

Liu, however, was not satisfied, and he demanded control of Dongchuan and Shannan West as well. When Emperor Xianzong refused, in early 806, Liu launched his forces and put the military governor of Dongchuan, Li Kang (李康), under siege at Dongchuan's capital prefecture Zi Prefecture (梓州), wanting to capture Dongchuan and put his colleague and friend Lu Wenruo (盧文若) in control of Dongchuan. When his assistant Lin Yun (林蘊) tried to dissuade him, he ordered that Lin be beheaded — but secretly told the executioner to halt the actual beheading, hoping that Lin would beg to be spared, and then he planned to spare Lin. As the executioner held the sword to Lin's neck and then withdrew it, and repeated it several times, Lin rebuked the executioner: "Scoundrel! If you want to behead me, go ahead. My neck is not your whetstone." Liu, hearing this, remarked: "This is truly a faithful and brave man." He thus spared Lin, only demoting him.

Hearing that Liu was attacking Dongchuan, Emperor Xianzong considered responding militarily, but was apprehensive that Xichuan was well-fortified. The chancellor Du Huangchang, however, advocated stern military action, pointing out that Liu was, in Du's words, "an insane civilian," who was not capable militarily. Du recommended the general Gao Chongwen to command the campaign against Liu, and Emperor Xianzong agreed, giving Gao the command of the various armies on the western border and ordering him to advance south against Liu, in association with Yan Li (嚴礪) the military governor of Shannan West. Emperor Xianzong still offered Liu a chance to apologize and submit, but Liu did not respond.

Meanwhile, Liu had captured Zi Prefecture and taken Li captive. Gao's forces soon arrived at Zi Prefecture, however, and Liu's forces were forced to withdraw. Liu sent Li to Gao, and requested that Gao help him receive a chance to apologize to Emperor Xianzong. Instead, Gao executed Li under the rationale that Li had brought disgrace to the imperial forces by his defeat. Emperor Xianzong soon issued an edict stripping Liu of all of his titles. Liu set up defenses at Lutou Pass (鹿頭關, in modern Deyang, Sichuan) and nearby Wanshengdui (萬勝堆). Gao, however, was able to defeat Liu's forces in eight straight battles, and Yan also defeated Liu's forces. Meanwhile, the imperial military officer Adie Guangyan cut off the supply route of Liu's army at Lutou Pass; in fear, Liu's commanders at Lutou Pass, Li Wenyue (李文悅) and Qiu Liangfu (仇良輔) surrendered, and Liu's son-in-law Su Jiang (蘇疆) was captured. With Lutou Pass out of the way, Gao headed straight for Xichuan's headquarters at Chengdu, and Liu's defenses completely collapsed.

On November 5, Chengdu fell. Liu and Lu took some cavalry soldiers and fled west, hoping to flee to Tufan. Gao sent soldiers to chase after them, and caught up with them at Yangguantian (羊灌田, in modern Chengdu). Liu jumped into a river, intending to commit suicide, but was taken out of the water by the imperial officer Li Dingjin (酈定進). Lu killed his wife and children, and then jumped into the river with rocks strapped to himself, and his body was not recovered.

Gao had Liu delivered to Chang'an. It said that on the way, Liu was still eating normally, believing that he would not be executed. He only became frightened when, as he approached Chang'an, soldiers of the imperial Shence Army (神策軍) bound his head and limbs. As he reached Chang'an, Emperor Xianzong ascended a tower to receive him as a captive, and had an eunuch read him a list of his crimes. He responded, "I, your subject, would not dare to rebel. It was that the soldiers of five camps wanted to do evil, and I was not able to stop them." Emperor Xianzong replied, "I sent an eunuch to deliver banners and your commission certificate. Why did you not accept them?" Liu was forced to admit his guilt. He was delivered to the imperial shrines, and then executed on December 12, 806. Also killed were several of his subordinates, as well as his nine sons.

== Notes and references ==
- Old Book of Tang, vol. 140.
- New Book of Tang, vol. 158.
- Zizhi Tongjian, vols. 236, 237.
