= Li Lin (prince) =

Chinese Tang dynasty Prince of Yong (died 757)

- Prince of Yong
- Born: between 718 and 725
- Died: 14 March 757
- Issue: Li Zan; Li Zhen; Li Xuan; Li Ling; Li Yi
- Father: Emperor Xuanzong of Tang
- Mother: Consort Guo

Li Lin (李璘) (died 14 March 757), né Li Ze (李澤), formally the Prince of Yong (永王), was an imperial prince of the Chinese Tang dynasty. He was a son of Emperor Xuanzong, and, after the general An Lushan had rebelled against Emperor Xuanzong's rule in 755, Li Lin tried to occupy the region south of the Yangtze River and establish a separate regime but was defeated and killed.

== Background ==
It is not known when Li Ze was born. (Note: However, it is known that his older brother Li Jiao (李璬), who was the 13th son, was born in 718, and given that Li Ze was himself created the Prince of Yong in 725, he must have been born during that time period.) It is known, however, that he was the 16th of Emperor Xuanzong's 30 sons, and that his mother Consort Guo was the younger sister of the military governor (jiedushi) Guo Xuji (郭虛己). Consort Guo died when Li Ze was only a few years old, and Li Ze was raised by his older brother Li Sisheng; it was said that at night, Li Sisheng would hold Li Ze in his arms. Li Ze was said to be intelligent in his youth but was ugly in appearance and had strabismus.

In 725, Emperor Xuanzong created Li Ze the Prince of Yong, and in 727 gave him the honorary title as the commandant at Jing Prefecture (荊州, roughly modern Jingzhou, Hubei). In 732, he was given the additional honorific title of Kaifu Yitong Sansi (開府儀同三司), and his name was changed to Li Lin.

== Rebellion ==
In 755, the general An Lushan rebelled, and by 756 was approaching the Tang capital Chang'an, forcing Emperor Xuanzong to flee toward Jiannan Circuit (劍南, roughly modern Sichuan and Chongqing, headquartered) with his family—although Li Sisheng (whose name had by now been changed to Li Heng and who was crown prince) did not follow Emperor Xuanzong to Jiannan Circuit but instead went to Lingwu and was declared emperor there (as Emperor Suzong). Meanwhile, though, Emperor Xuanzong, who had not known that Emperor Suzong had taken the imperial title, continued to issue edicts as emperor, and on 15 August 756, he issued an edict giving Li Heng and three other sons of his—Li Lin and his younger brothers Li Qi (李琦) the Prince of Sheng and Li Gong (李珙) the Prince of Feng—responsibility zones for them to command over, with Li Heng in overall command. (Li Qi and Li Gong, however, did not actually report to their command areas.) Li Lin's responsibility area were Shannan East (山南東道, headquartered in modern Xiangfan, Hubei), Lingnan (headquartered in modern Guangzhou, Guangdong), Qianzhong (黔中, headquartered in modern Chongqing), and Jiangnan West (江南西道, headquartered in modern Nanchang, Jiangxi) Circuits, with the officials Dou Shao (竇紹) and Li Xian as his assistants, and his headquarters set at Jiangling. Later, when Emperor Xuanzong heard about Emperor Suzong's ascension, he recognized Emperor Suzong as emperor and himself took the title of Taishang Huang (retired emperor).

With the empire's transportation network disrupted by An's rebellion, the taxes and levies of the region south of the Huai River were all sent to Jiangling, allowing Li Lin access to a great amount of wealth and ability to conscript tens of thousands of soldiers. His son Li Yi (李㑥) the Prince of Xiangcheng (Note: The Prince of Xiangcheng's name was recorded as "Yang" (瑒) in Zizhi Tongjian; "Yi" comes from Li Lin's biographies in both Books of Tang. Also, the character "瑒" has two pronunciations: "chàng" and "yáng".) was said to be brave and studied in military matters, and his strategist Xue Liu (薛鏐) suggested to him that given the amount of wealth and territory he had, he should occupy Jinling (金陵, modern Nanjing), take over all of the territory south of the Yangtze River, and establish a separate regime similar to Eastern Jin. When Emperor Suzong heard this, he issued an order that Li Lin return to Chengdu to accompany Emperor Xuanzong, but Li Lin refused. This alarmed Li Xian, who claimed to be ill and resigned, and then reported to Emperor Suzong's then-location at Pengyuan (彭原, in modern Qingyang, Gansu). Both he and another official, Gao Shi (高適), then proposed strategies to stop Li Lin's plan. Around the new year 757, Emperor Suzong commissioned Gao as the military governor of Huainan Circuit (淮南, headquartered in modern Yangzhou, Jiangsu), and another general, Lai Tian (來瑱), as the military governor of Huainan West Circuit (淮南西道, headquartered in modern Zhumadian, Henan), and instructed them to, along with Wei Zhi (韋陟) the military governor of Jiangdong Circuit (江東, headquartered in modern Suzhou, Jiangsu), to prepare to resist Li Lin.

On 19 January 757, Li Lin, without any imperial permission, left Jiangling with a fleet, heading east on the Yangtze. Li Xiyan (李希言) the governor of Wu Commandery (roughly modern Suzhou) then sent him a letter that treated him as an equal and addressed him by name, inquiring as for the reason for him to be heading east. Li Lin, in anger, replied in a letter:

I, the Prince, am a servant of the Taishang Huang and a brother of the Emperor. Local officials need to honor marquesses and princes, and they need to pay proper respect as subordinates. You need to pay this respect in your letters as well. Now you wrote a letter treating me as an equal addressing me by name. Where have the regulations from Han dynasty and Sui dynasty gone?

Li Lin then ordered his generals Hun Weiming (渾惟明) to attack Li Xiyan, and Ji Guangchen (季廣琛) to attack Li Chengshi (李成式) the secretary general of Guangling Commandery (廣陵, roughly modern Yangzhou). He himself advanced to Dangtu (當塗, in modern Ma'anshan, Anhui). Li Xiyan sent his subordinates Yuan Jingyao (元景曜) and Yan Jingzhi (閻敬之) and Li Chengshi sent his subordinate Li Chengqing (李承慶) to resist Li Lin, but Li Lin's forces killed Yan, and Yuan and Li Chengqing surrendered to Li Lin. Meanwhile, Gao, Lai, and Wei rendezvoused at Anlu (安陸, in modern Xiaogan, Hubei) and publicly declared their intent to suppress Li Lin's rebellion.

Meanwhile, Li Lin had taken position in a city. (Note: None of the main traditional historical sources reporting Li Lin's rebellion mentioned which city this was. The modern Chinese historian Bo Yang opined that it was probably Zhenjiang. See the Bo Yang Edition of the Zizhi Tongjian, vol. 53 [757].) The forces of the general Li Xian (李銑, note different character than Li Lin's former assistant) and Li Chengshi converged on the city, stopping north of the Yangtze River. In light of the pressure, Li Lin's subordinates Ji, Hun, and Feng Jikang (馮季康) deserted him. That night, when Li Xian's and Li Chengshi's forces lit torches to try to intimidate Li Lin, Li Lin's forces responded by lighting torches as well, but Li Lin, when he saw his own forces' torches, mistakenly thought that Li Xian's and Li Chengshi's forces had already crossed the Yangtze, and he panicked, fleeing out of the city at night, only returning in the day. He then took his remaining forces and headed east on ships. Li Chengshi's subordinate Zhao Kan (趙侃) gave chase, catching Li Lin at Xinfeng (新豐, in modern Changzhou, Jiangsu), defeating Li Yang and Li Lin's general Gao Xianqi (高仙琦) and causing Li Lin's forces to collapse.

Li Lin and Gao fled to Poyang (鄱陽, in modern Shangrao, Jiangxi) and gathered military supplies there, intending to flee to Lingnan. Huangfu Shen (皇甫侁) the examiner of Jiangnan West Circuit gave chase and captured Li Lin. He then secretly put Li Lin to death. (Note: That Huangfu put Li Lin to death was per the accounts in the New Book of Tang and the Zizhi Tongjian. Li Lin's biography in the Old Book of Tang indicated that Li Lin was killed in battle.) Li Yang was killed in battle. Li Lin's surviving family members were delivered to Chengdu. Emperor Suzong, because of the love he had for Li Lin, chose not to publicly declare Li Lin a rebel, and when he found out that Huangfu had put Li Lin to death, he relieved Huangfu from his office and never gave him another one. Li Lin's sons Li Zan (李儹), Li Zhen (李偵), Li Xuan (李儇), Li Ling (李伶), and Li Yi (李儀) were allowed to keep their titles. (Note: Li Lin's biography in Old Book of Tang recorded that his sons were killed; his biography in New Book of Tang recorded that only Li Yi (李㑥; Prince of Xiangcheng) was killed.)

== Family ==
- Father
  - Emperor Xuanzong of Tang
- Mother
  - Consort Guo
- Issues and Descendents:
  - Li Yi, Prince of Xiangcheng Commandery (襄城郡王 李㑥), first son.
  - Li Zan, Prince of Yuyao Commandery (餘姚郡王 李儹), second son.
  - Li Zhen, Duke of Ju (莒國公 李偵), third son.
  - Li Xuan, Duke of Cheng (郕國公 李儇), fourth son.
  - Li Ling (李伶), fifth son.
  - Li Yi (李儀), sixth son.
