= Pei Yanling =

Chinese economist, historian, and politician

Pei Yanling (裴延齡) (728 – October 23, 796) was a Chinese economist, historian, and politician during the Tang dynasty of China. He was a close associate of Emperor Dezong and was in charge of financial matters. He drew severe criticism from traditional historical accounts for his frivolousness, fiscal irresponsibility, and attacks against other officials.

== Background ==
Pei Yanling was born in 728, during the reign of Emperor Xuanzong. His family was from Hezhong Municipality (河中, in modern Yuncheng, Shanxi). His father Pei Xu (裴旭) served as a prefectural prefect. Toward the end of the Qianyuan era (758-760) of Emperor Xuanzong's son Emperor Suzong, Pei Yanling was serving as the sheriff of Sishui County (汜水, in modern Luoyang, Henan), when the nearby eastern capital Luoyang was captured by the rebel Yan army. Pei fled to E Prefecture (鄂州, in modern Ezhou, Hubei). During his time there, he edited the commentaries that Pei Yin (裴駰) wrote for the Records of the Grand Historian, and referred to himself as "Little Pei" in his remarks.

== During Emperor Dezong's reign ==
=== Prior to becoming Minister of Finance ===
When Dong Jin was serving as the prefect of Hua Prefecture (華州, in modern Weinan, Shaanxi), he invited Pei Yanling to serve as his assistant in his role as defender of Tong Pass. (Note: It is not completely clear when Dong was made the prefect of Hua Prefecture, but it was definitely during Emperor Dezong's reign, which began in 779, and he left his post in 783, so Pei's service under him would have occurred during those years. See Old Book of Tang, vol. 145.) Later, when a regional surveyor recommended Pei for his abilities, Pei was recalled to the capital Chang'an to serve as Taichang Boshi (太常博士), a scholar at the ministry of worship (太常寺, Taichang Si). When Lu Qi was chancellor, Pei was promoted to be Shanbu Yuanwailang (膳部員外郎), a low-level official at the ministry of rites (禮部, Libu) and an imperial scholar at Jixian Institute (集賢院); he later became Cibu Langzhong (祠部郎中), a supervisorial official at the ministry of rites. (Note: Lu served as chancellor from 781 to 783, so Pei's recall to Chang'an would have taken place during those years. See Old Book of Tang, vol. 135.) While Cui Zao was chancellor, Cui was in charge of the finances, and he sent Pei to Luoyang to be in charge of the financial matters at the Luoyang branch government. After Han Huang took over the financial matters, Pei was recalled to Chang'an to resume his duties as Cibu Langzhong and imperial scholar. (Note: Cui was only chancellor in 786, and therefore that commission would have occurred during that year. See Old Book of Tang, vol. 130.) Once Pei arrived at Chang'an, however, he did not wait for imperial orders to clarify his responsibilities and directly headed for Jixian Institute to resume his duties there. This displeased the chancellor Zhang Yanshang, and Zhang had him demoted to be the magistrate of Zhaoying County (昭應, near Chang'an). While he was serving there, there was an occasion when he had a disagreement with the mayor of Jingzhao Municipality (京兆, i.e., the Chang'an region), Zheng Shuze (鄭叔則), and he submitted a petition attacking Zheng. The chancellor Li Mi favored Zheng, but the deputy chief imperial censor Dou Can, who was jealous of Li and protective of Pei, sided with Pei in the dispute. As a result, Zheng was demoted to be a prefectural prefect, while Pei was recalled to serve as Zhuzuolang (著作郎), an imperial librarian. When Dou subsequently became chancellor, he made Pei the deputy minister of imperial supplies (太府少卿, Taifu Shaoqing) and later the deputy minister of agriculture (司農少卿, Sinong Shaoqing). (Note: It is not clear when Dou became deputy chief imperial censor, but Li died in 789 and Dou was made chancellor at that time, and was exiled in 792, so the events must have occurred around those times. See Old Book of Tang, vol. 136.)

=== As Minister of Finance ===
In 792, Ban Hong (班宏) the director of finances died. The chancellor Lu Zhi recommended Li Sun (李巽) as Ban's replacement, and Emperor Dezong initially agreed. However, he soon changed his mind and wanted to replace Ban with Pei Yanling; he made Pei the deputy minister of census (戶部侍郎, Hubu Shilang) and the director of finances. Lu submitted a petition severely criticizing Pei for frivolousness and lack of judgment, but Emperor Dezong did not take heed. As Pei was not himself familiar with financial matters, he summoned experienced administrators at the directorate of finances and asked them for suggestions on how to please the emperor. In 793, he came up with a scheme — to change, on the books, uncollectible tax debts from the various prefectures into collectible ones, and moving the tax revenues that were actually submitted into a new separate storage. In all, no actual revenues were created, but Emperor Dezong was fooled into believing that Pei could increase the wealth of the state and therefore favored him more. Pei also falsely claimed that there was a large meadow to the west of Chang'an that could be used for raising horses — which turned out to be nonexistent when Emperor Dezong sent investigators to consider it for that purpose, but Emperor Dezong did not punish him, despite criticism by other officials. Also at Pei's suggestion, Emperor Dezong left many officials' positions unfilled in order to save money, notwithstanding the necessity for those positions to be filled. Pei further suggested that the money used on imperial temples be diverted to Emperor Dezong's own palace, and also falsely claimed that he had access to giant trees for the building of a temple that Emperor Dezong commissioned, Shenlong Temple (神龍寺) — such that when Emperor Dezong pointed out that those giants trees were not even available during the prosperous reign of Emperor Xuanzong, he responded that Emperor Xuanzong's reign was not impressive enough for those trees to reveal themselves. It was said that Emperor Dezong actually did realize that Pei was frivolous and often spoke untruths, but that he was happy to hear Pei gossip about other officials, and therefore continued to favor Pei.

It was said that only several officials whose responsibilities were directly related to Pei's — Zhang Pang (張滂) the director of the salt and iron monopolies, Li Chong (李充) the mayor of Jingzhao, and Li Xian (李銛) the minister of agriculture — dared to speak out against him, in addition to Lu, who repeatedly submitted petitions attacking Pei. However, Emperor Dezong's trust in Pei was not shaken, and instead, he began to be disaffected from Lu, whose opinion he had deeply valued previously. Lu's criticism of Pei was further neutralized when his chancellor colleague Zhao Jing began to leak Lu's criticism to Pei, such that Pei was able to anticipate it and deflect it. Around the new year 796, Lu was removed from his chancellor position, and thereafter Pei began to strike back, accusing Zhang, Li Chong, and Li Xian of being Lu's partisans, spreading rumors to cause soldiers to resent Emperor Dezong and Pei and to encourage them to mutiny. When an imperial guard soldier complained to Emperor Dezong that his corps was being inadequately supplied, Emperor Dezong came to believe that Pei was telling the truth about Lu and the others. In spring 796, he exiled Lu, Zhang, Li Chong, and Li Xian, to distant prefectures to be prefectural officials. In the aftermaths of these officials' exile, a number of low-level officials in charge of submitting suggestions to the emperor, led by Yang Cheng (陽城), submitted petitions attacking Pei and defending Lu and the others, but the petitions fell on deaf ears. However, despite expectations at the time that Pei would soon be made chancellor, Pei was never made chancellor. Still, Pei was promoted to be the minister of census (戶部尚書, Hubu Shangshu). It was said, though, that Pei was confident that he would become chancellor, and he was abusive in his language toward other officials. Further, when he subsequently grew ill, he was freely delivering items from the imperial treasury to his own home, but no one dared to speak against him. Pei died in fall 796, and it was said that no official mourned him, and many people actually celebrated, but Emperor Dezong mourned deeply and posthumously honored him. During the reign of Emperor Dezong's grandson Emperor Xianzong, Pei was given the posthumous name Miao (繆, meaning "untrue").

The Later Jin historian Liu Xu, the lead editor of the Old Book of Tang, commented thus about Pei and another official during the reign of Emperor Xianzong, Huangfu Bo:

Evil and wicked people had been harming the righteous ever since ancient times, but for someone who was so careless in his frivolousness and falsehood, as well as his jealousy of the talented and harmfulness to the good, no one could compare to Pei Yanling and Huangfu Bo. Whenever I, your subject, (Note: Liu, in his comment, was presumably addressing his emperor, Emperor Gaozu of Later Jin.) read Chancellor Lu's comments on Pei, I always get emotional and weep.
