= Wang Yu (chancellor) =

Wang Yu (王璵) (died July 6, 768) was a Chinese politician during the Tang dynasty, who became trusted by Emperor Suzong due to his studies in witchcraft and the employment of such witchcraft on Emperor Suzong's behalf, such that Emperor Suzong eventually made him chancellor.

== Background ==
It is not known when Wang Yu was born. He was a fifth-generation descendant of Wang Fangqing, who served as a chancellor during the reign of Wu Zetian. His intervening ancestors' names were recorded as Wang Jiao (王曒), Wang Chong (王寵), Wang Zhonglian (王仲連), and Wang Shao (王紹), none of whom was recorded to have carried any official titles except for Wang Jiao who served as prefect of Lu Prefecture and Wang Zhonglian who served as a secretarial officer at Yang Prefecture (揚州, roughly modern Yangzhou, Jiangsu). Wang Yu himself was said to be well-studied in the worshipping of gods and spirits and particularly paid attention to the proper times to offer sacrifices.

== During Emperor Xuanzong's reign ==
Toward the end of the Kaiyuan era (713-742) of Wu Zetian's grandson Emperor Xuanzong, Emperor Xuanzong was paying great attention to Taoist doctrines and ceremonies. Wang Yu made a submission to Emperor Xuanzong requesting that an altar, to be called the Spring Altar (春壇, Chun Tan), be built to the east of the capital Chang'an and dedicated to the Blue Emperor (青帝, Qing Di). Emperor Xuanzong agreed, and he made Wang an official-scholar at the ministry of worship (太常寺, Taichang Si) and an imperial censor (侍御史, Shiyushi), as well as a special emissary of worship (祠祭使, Ciji Shi). It was said that Wang drew favors from the emperor due to his dedication to worshipping gods on Emperor Xuanzong's behalf. It was further said that while previously, the common populace already had a custom of sacrificing joss paper to the spirits, it was Wang who brought this custom into official ceremonies.

== During Emperor Suzong's and Emperor Daizong's reigns ==
After Emperor Xuanzong's son Emperor Suzong became emperor in 756, Wang Yu was promoted to be the minister of worship (太常卿, Taichang Qing). Because his worship of the gods pleased Emperor Suzong, Emperor Suzong often gave him rewards. In 758, when Emperor Suzong removed the chancellors Cui Yuan and Li Lin from their posts, he made Wang Zhongshu Shilang (中書侍郎) -- the deputy head of the legislative bureau of government (中書省, Zhongshu Sheng) and gave him the designation Tong Zhongshu Menxia Pingzhangshi (同中書門下平章事), making him a chancellor de facto. It was said that even before this, Wang did not have a good reputation among the people, and after he was made chancellor, his reputation grew worse due to his incompetence.

At Wang's suggestion, Emperor Suzong built an altar dedicated to the god Taiyi (太一 or 太乙) to the south of Chang'an. Around this time, Emperor Suzong was ill, and the fortunetellers told him that he was being cursed by a god of a mountain or a river. Wang thus suggested that a group of witches and eunuchs be commissioned to go to various mountains and rivers of the empire to pray for Emperor Suzong. The witches that Wang selected used this opportunity to extort bribes from the local officials. One of them, who was sent to Huang Prefecture (黃州, in modern Wuhan, Hubei), took an entourage of several tens of young hoodlums with her and stayed at the station for imperial messengers with them. When the prefect of Huang Prefecture, Zuo Zhen (左震), visited in the morning, he found the station door locked. He became angry, and he ordered that his police officers break into the station and that the witch be dragged out to be decapitated. He also killed the hoodlums that she was with, and then confiscated the bribes that they were carrying. He submitted the funds to Emperor Suzong and requested that the funds be used to pay the taxes that the people of Huang Prefecture would otherwise be responsible for. Emperor Suzong accepted the funds but did not punish Wang. In 759, indeed, pursuant to Wang's suggestions, he personally offered sacrifices to the gods of the nine palaces (九宮神, Jiugong Shen). Later that year, however, he made Wang the minister of justice (刑部尚書, Xingbu Shangshu) and removed him from the chancellor position.

In 760, Wang was made the prefect of Pu Prefecture (蒲州, roughly modern Yuncheng, Shanxi), as well as the military governor (jiedushi) of the surrounding prefectures. In 761, Wang was made the secretary general at Yang Prefecture as well as the military governor of Huainan Circuit (淮南, i.e., the region between the Huai River and Yangtze River). After an occasion after Emperor Suzong offered sacrifices, he made Wang the governor of Yue Prefecture (越州, roughly modern Shaoxing, Zhejiang) as well as the military governor of Zhedong Circuit (浙東, i.e., the region east of the Qiantang River). Sometime thereafter, he was recalled to serve as Taizi Shaobao (太子少保) and then Taizi Shaoshi (太子少師) -- both positions advisorial positions to the crown prince. Wang died in 768, during the reign of Emperor Suzong's son Emperor Daizong. He was buried with honors and given the posthumous name Jianhuai (簡懷, meaning "undiscriminating and just"). His great-grandson Wang Tuan later served as a chancellor near the end of the Tang dynasty, under Emperor Zhaozong.

== Notes and references ==
- Old Book of Tang, vol. 130.
- New Book of Tang, vol. 109.
- Zizhi Tongjian, vols. 220, 221.
