= Songzhou =

Historical administrative division in China

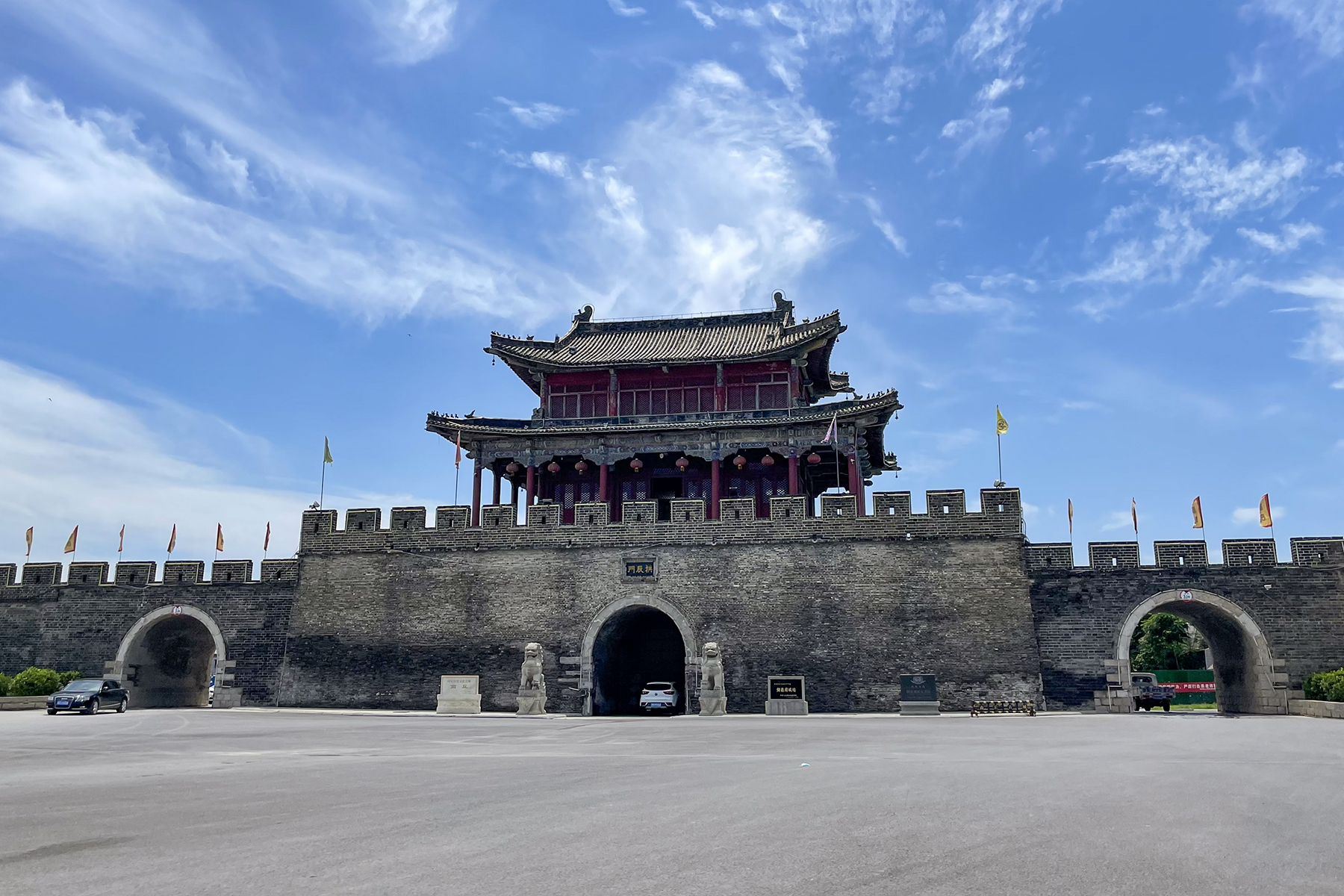
Historic Shangqiu city, which used to be the administrative seat of Songzhou

Songzhou or Song Prefecture (宋州) was a zhou (prefecture) in imperial China centering on modern Shangqiu, Henan, China. It existed from 596 to 1006. Songzhou was established in 596, during the Sui dynasty, with its administrative seat at Suiyang County (睢陽縣, modern Shangqiu, Henan). This region was named after the ancient Song state which existed during the Zhou dynasty, from 11th century to 3rd century BC. Historically, the founder of Liu Song, Emperor Wu of Song adopted this as the name of his dynasty.

During the Tang dynasty, Suiyang County was renamed Songcheng County (宋城縣). Songzhou was known as Suiyang Prefecture (睢陽郡) between 744 and 758. After the Tang collapsed, Emperor Taizu of Song used be a military leader stationed in Songzhou, thus his dynasty also adopted this name, which was later known as the Song dynasty.

In 1006 Songzhou was elevated to Nanjing Yingtian Prefecture (南京應天府) and made one of the four capitals of Northern Song dynasty.

== Geography ==
The administrative region of Songzhou in the Tang dynasty is in the border area of modern eastern Henan, northern Anhui and southwestern Shandong. It probably includes parts of modern:

- Under the administration of Shangqiu, Henan:
  - Shangqiu: Liangyuan District and Suiyang District
  - Minquan County
  - Sui County
  - Ningling County
  - Zhecheng County
  - Yucheng County
  - Xiayi County
- Under the administration of Heze, Shandong:
  - Shan County
  - Cao County
- Under the administration of Suzhou, Anhui:
  - Dangshan County
