= S60 Shangqiu–Dengfeng Expressway =

Road in Henan, China

Shangqiu–Dengfeng Expressway
- Shangdeng Expressway 商登高速
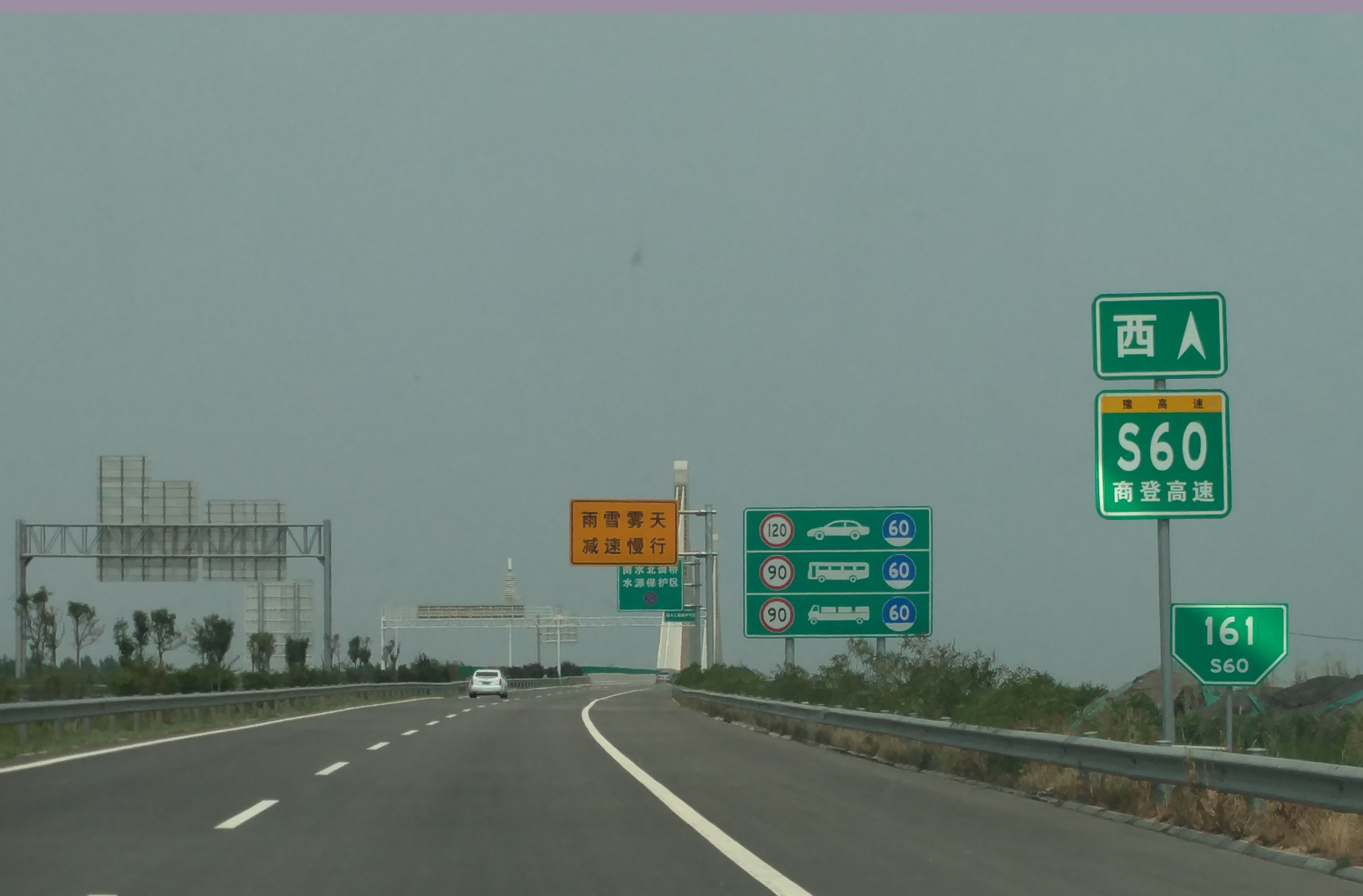

Route information
- Length: 222 km (138 mi)
- Existed: 2015–present

Major junctions
- East end: Henan S325 in Liangyuan District, Shangqiu, Henan
- G30 in Liangyuan District, Shangqiu; G45 in Tongxu County, Kaifeng; Henan S83 in Weishi County, Kaifeng; Henan S89 in Weishi County, Kaifeng; G4 in Xinzheng, Zhengzhou; Henan S88 in Xinmi, Zhengzhou
- West end: Henan S85 in Dengfeng, Zhengzhou, Henan

Location
- Country: China
- Province: Henan

Highway system
- Transport in China

The Shangqiu–Dengfeng Expressway (Chinese: 商丘－登封高速公路), abbreviated as Shangdeng Expressway (Chinese: 商登高速) and designated as S60 in Henan's expressway system, is 222-kilometre (138 mi) long regional expressway in Henan, China.

== History ==
The Shangqiu–Zhengzhou Airport Economy Zone section was opened in 2015 and the whole expressway was opened in 2017.

== List of exits ==
Location	km	mi	Exit	Name	Destinations	Notes
Henan S60 (Shangqiu–Dengfeng Expressway)
Liangyuan District, Shangqiu				Shangqiu Airport	Henan S325 – Guantang Town	Eastern terminus
Liangyuan District, Shangqiu	Shangqiu Airport Toll Booth					
Liangyuan District, Shangqiu				G30 – Shangqiu, Minquan, Kaifeng		
Ningling County, Shangqiu				South Ningling	Henan S210 – Ningling	
Suixian, Shangqiu				East Suixian	Henan S214 – Suixian	
Suixian, Shangqiu				West Suixian	Henan S211 – Suixian	
Suixian, Shangqiu	Suixian Service Area					
Qixian, Kaifeng				South Qixian	G106 – Qixian, Xingkou, Fuji	
Tongxu County, Kaifeng	Sisuolou Service Area					
Tongxu County, Kaifeng				Sisuolou Interchange	G45 – Kaifeng, Zhoukou	
Tongxu County, Kaifeng				South Tongxu	X022 – Tongxu	
Weishi County, Kaifeng				Henan S83 – Lankao, Weishi, Xuchang		
Weishi County, Kaifeng				North Weishi	Henan S219 – Weishi	
Weishi County, Kaifeng	Weishi Service Area					
Weishi County, Kaifeng				Henan S89 – Xihua		
Weishi County, Kaifeng				Gangli	New G107 – [[|]], ,	Under construction
Xinzheng, Zhengzhou				Garden-Expo Park	Liangzhou Avenue – Zhengzhou Airport Economy Zone, Zhengzhou Garden Expo Park, Shuanghe Lake Central Park	
Xinzheng, Zhengzhou				Xinzheng Interchange	G4 – Zhengzhou, Xinzheng, Xuchang	
Xinzheng, Zhengzhou				Xincun	G107 – Xinzheng, Xincun, Guodian	
Xinmi, Zhengzhou				Henan S88 – Zhengzhou, Yuzhou		
Xinmi, Zhengzhou				Huangdigong	Y036 – Huangdi Palace	
Xinmi, Zhengzhou	Huangdigong Service Area					
Xinmi, Zhengzhou				Dakui	Zhougan Road – Dakui	Under construction
Xinmi, Zhengzhou				Chaohuasi	Mizhou Avenue – Chaohua	
Xinmi, Zhengzhou				Gucheng Xianya	Henan S232 – Xinmi	
Dengfeng, Zhengzhou				Henan S85 – Zhengzhou, Dengfeng, Shaolin Monastery		Western terminus
Closed/former; Concurrency terminus; HOV only; Incomplete access; Tolled; Route transition; Unopened
