= Shaogang =

Shaogang may refer to these places in China:

- Shaogang Township (邵岗乡), a township in Huoqiu County, Anhui
- Shaogang, Henan (稍岗), a town in Yucheng County, Henan
- Shaogang, Ningxia (邵岗), a town in Qingtongxia, Ningxia

== See also ==
- Shaoguan Iron and Steel, a Chinese steel maker based in Shaoguan, Guangdong, colloquially abbreviated as Shaogang (韶钢; 'Shao steel') in Chinese
