= Ninglingxian railway station =

Railway station in Ningling County, Henan, China

Ninglingxian 宁陵县
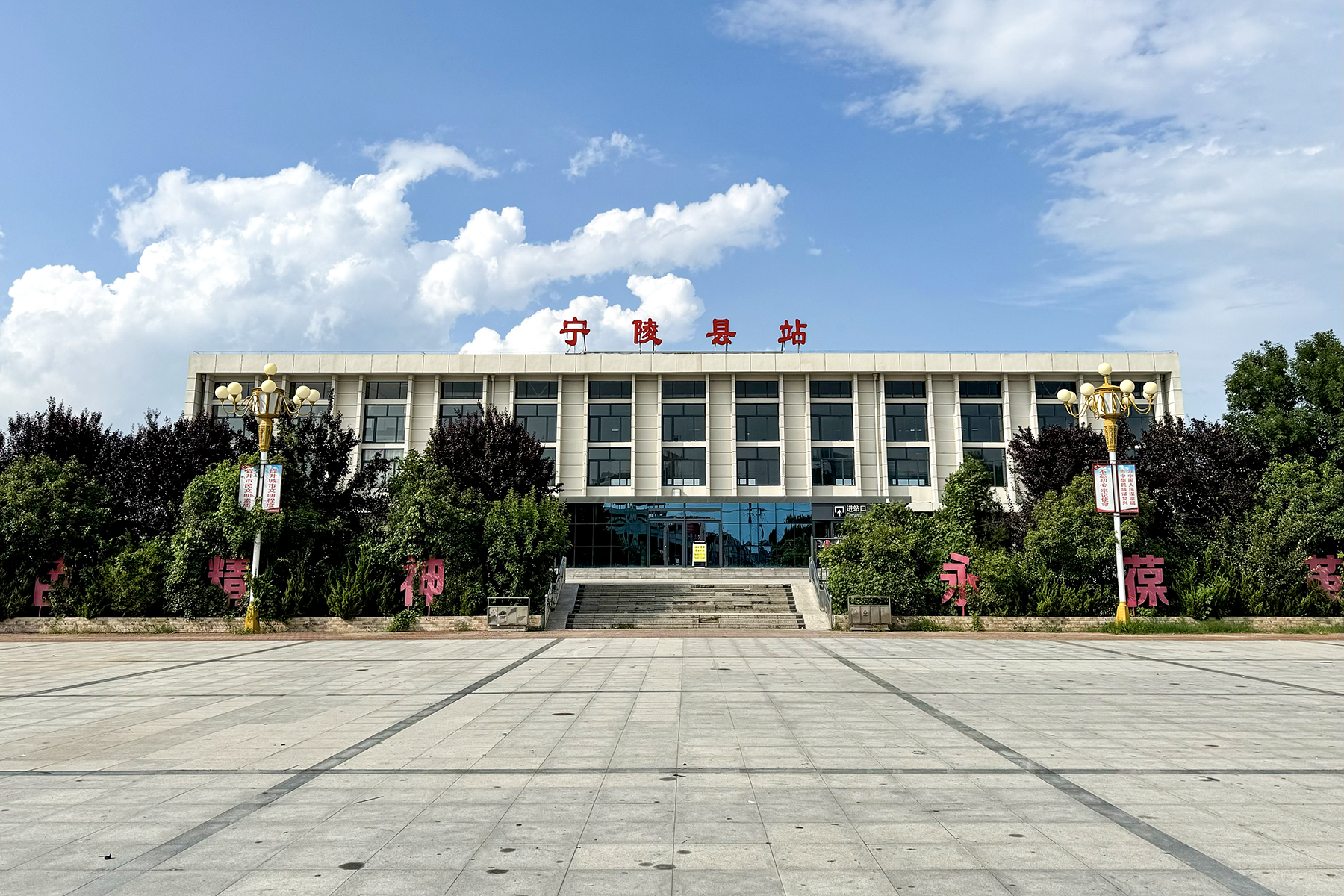

General information
- Location: Ningling County, Shangqiu, Henan; China
- Coordinates: 34.5751°N 115.3125°E
- Operator: CR Zhengzhou
- Line: Longhai railway
- Platforms: 3 (1 side platform and 1 island platform)

Other information
- Station code: 38732 (TMIS code); NLF (telegraph code); NLX (Pinyin code)
- Classification: Class 3 station (三等站)

History
- Opened: 1915
- Former names: Liuhezhen (Chinese: 柳河镇)

Services
| Preceding station | China Railway | Following station |
|---|---|---|
| Shangqiu towards Lianyungang East | Longhai railway | Minquan towards Lanzhou |
Location
- Location within Henan Location within China

Ninglingxian railway station (Chinese: 宁陵县站, literally "Ningling County railway station") is a station on Longhai railway in Ningling County, Shangqiu, Henan.

== History ==
The station was established in 1915.
