= Pingtai Subdistrict =

Pingtai Subdistrict 平台街道
- Subdistrict
- Location in Henan
- Coordinates: 34°23′51″N 115°42′35″E
- Country: People's Republic of China
- Province: Henan
- Prefecture-level city: Shangqiu
- District: Liangyuan
- Elevation: 52 m (171 ft)
- Time zone: UTC+8 (China Standard)
- Area code: 0370

Pingtai Subdistrict (simplified Chinese: 平台街道; traditional Chinese: 平台街道 or 平臺街道; pinyin: Píngtái Jiēdào; lit. 'platform or terrace') is a subdistrict of Liangyuan District, Shangqiu, Henan province, People's Republic of China, located on the southeastern outskirts of the city. As of 2011, it has 11 villages under its administration.

== See also ==
- List of township-level divisions of Henan
