= Xiayixian railway station =

Railway station in Shangqiu, China

Xiayixian 夏邑县

General information
- Location: Western section of Zhanqian Road; Xiayi County, Shangqiu, Henan; China
- Coordinates: 34.4119°N 116.0246°E
- Operator: CR Shanghai
- Line: Longhai railway
- Platforms: 3 (1 side platform and 1 island platform)

Other information
- Station code: 38687 (TMIS code); EJH (telegraph code); XYX (Pinyin code)
- Classification: Class 4 station (四等站)

History
- Opened: 1915

Services
Preceding station	China Railway	Following station
Dangshan towards Lianyungang East	Longhai railway	Yuchengxian towards Lanzhou
Location
- Location within Henan Location within China

Xiayixian railway station (Chinese: 夏邑县站, literally "Xiayi County railway station") is a station on Longhai railway in Xiayi County, Shangqiu, Henan.

== History ==
The station was established in 1915.
