= Liangyuan (disambiguation) =

Liangyuan was the ancient Chinese villa of Liu Wu. Liangyuan may also refer to:

- Liangyuan district, Shangqiu, Henan
- Liang's Garden, Foshan, Guangdong
