= Shuangta (disambiguation) =

Shuangta (双塔区) is a district of Chaoyang, Liaoning, People's Republic of China (PRC).

Shuāngtǎ (双塔) may also refer to the following locations in the PRC:

- Shuangta, Jize County, town in Hebei
- Shuangta, Pulandian, town in Liaoning
- Shuangta Township, Gansu, in Guazhou County
- Shuangta Township, Henan, in Minquan County
- Shuangta Subdistrict, Zhuozhou, Hebei
- Shuangta Subdistrict, Suzhou, in Gusu District (formerly Canglang District), Suzhou, Jiangsu
- Shuangta Subdistrict, Jiangshan, Zhejiang
