= Xieji, Henan =

Xieji 谢集镇
- Town
- Location in Henan
- Coordinates: 34°31′11″N 115°28′33″E
- Country: People's Republic of China
- Province: Henan
- Prefecture-level city: Shangqiu
- District: Liangyuan
- Village-level divisions: 25 villages
- Elevation: 54 m (177 ft)
- Time zone: UTC+8 (China Standard)
- Area code: 0370

Xieji (simplified Chinese: 谢集; traditional Chinese: 謝集; pinyin: Xièjí) is a town of Liangyuan District, in the northwestern suburbs of Shangqiu, Henan, People's Republic of China, located about 8 kilometres (5.0 mi) from the border with Shandong. As of 2011, it has 25 villages under its administration.

== See also ==
- List of township-level divisions of Henan
