= Yingguo =

Yingguo 营郭镇
- Town
- Location in Henan
- Coordinates: 34°06′17″N 115°47′37″E
- Country: People's Republic of China
- Province: Henan
- Prefecture-level city: Shangqiu
- County: Yucheng
- Time zone: UTC+8 (China Standard)

Yingguo
- Traditional Chinese: 營郭
- Simplified Chinese: 营郭
- Literal meaning: wall of barracks
Transcriptions
Standard Mandarin
- Hanyu Pinyin: Yíngguō
- Wade–Giles: Ing2-kuo1
- IPA: [ǐŋ.kwó]

Yingguo (simplified Chinese: 营郭; traditional Chinese: 營郭; pinyin: Yíngguō) is a town in eastern Henan province, China, near the border with Anhui province. It is under the administration of Yucheng County. Its Anglicized spelling can be mistaken for the Mandarin word for United Kingdom, or for a type of grain.
