= LKF (disambiguation) =

LKF may refer to:

- Lan Kwai Fong, a small square of streets in Central, Hong Kong
- Lietuvos krepšinio federacija, a national governing body of basketball in Lithuania
- Laboral Kutxa–Fundación Euskadi, the UCI code LKF
- Lake Gardens railway station, the station code LKF
- Lankao railway station, the telegraph code LKF
