= Dai Xu =

Chinese author and social commentator

- 戴旭
- Born: September 30, 1964 (age 62); Minquan County, Shangqiu, Henan, China
- Education: PLA Nanjing Political College; Air Force Engineering University
- Military career
- Allegiance: People's Republic of China
- Branch: People's Liberation Army Air Force
- Rank: Senior Colonel
- Website: weibo.com/daixu

Dai Xu (Chinese: 戴旭; pinyin: Dài Xù; born 30 September 1964) is a Chinese author, social commentator, and the president of the Marine Institute For Security And Cooperation (海洋安全与合作研究院). He is also a professor at the PLA National Defense University. Xu holds the rank of Senior Colonel in the People's Liberation Army Air Force. He is a supporter of communist orthodoxy, and has expressed strong Chinese nationalist sentiments.

== Biography ==
Dai was born in Minquan County, Henan, on September 30, 1964. He graduated from the Telecommunication Engineering Institute, Air Force Engineering University and the Shanghai Branch, Nanjing Political Academy; and has served as a journalist on several publications, including the Global Times, People's Daily Online, and Utopia (Internet forum). He has published many books on military affairs.

== Controversies ==
Dai is often noted for expressing hawkish or controversial opinions. In August 2012, for example, he described Vietnam, the Philippines and Japan as "the three running dogs of the United States in Asia," and argued that "We only need to kill one, and it will immediately bring the others to heel."

=== Bird flu ===
In 2013, Dai wrote "Bird flu is the newest US bioweapon. It's all about terrifying lasers, and much less about engineering a new strain of bird flu to deploy against Chinese citizens." on his Sina Weibo.

=== Kaifu Lee ===
In 2013, Dai said "Kaifu Lee is a CIA agent" on his Sina Weibo.

=== South China Sea ===
In December 2018, he suggested that China's navy should ram United States Navy ships sailing in the disputed South China Sea.
