= Minquan railway station =

Railway station in Shangqiu, China

Minquan 民权
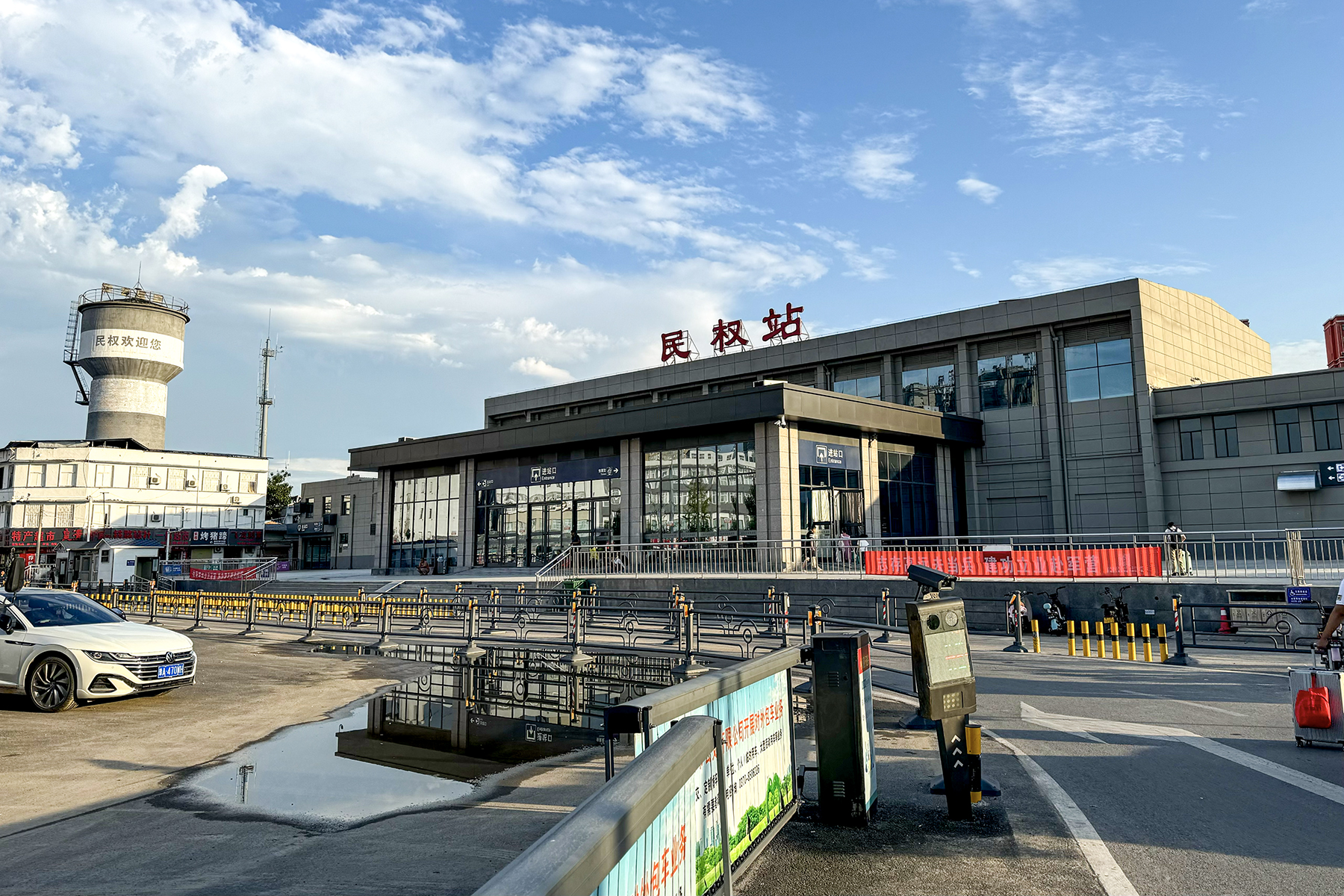
- Picture of Minquan Railway Station in China

General information
- Location: Heping W. Road; Minquan County, Shangqiu, Henan; China
- Coordinates: 34.6459°N 115.1344°E
- Operator: CR Zhengzhou
- Line: Longhai railway

Other information
- Station code: 38738 (TMIS code); MQF (telegraph code); MQU (Pinyin code)
- Classification: Class 3 station (三等站)

History
- Opened: 1915
- Former names: Tianzhuang (Chinese: 田庄)

Services
Preceding station	China Railway	Following station
Ninglingxian towards Lianyungang East	Longhai railway	Lankao towards Lanzhou
Location
- Location within Henan Location within China

Minquan railway station (Chinese: 民权站) is a station on Longhai railway in Minquan County, Shangqiu, Henan.

== History ==
The station was established in 1915.

== See also ==
- Minquan North railway station
