= Liuji Township, Henan =

Liuji Township 刘集乡
- Township
- Location in Henan
- Coordinates: 34°31′50″N 116°01′19″E
- Country: People's Republic of China
- Province: Henan
- Prefecture-level city: Shangqiu
- County: Yucheng
- Elevation: 48 m (157 ft)
- Time zone: UTC+8 (China Standard)

Liuji Township (simplified Chinese: 刘集乡; traditional Chinese: 劉集鄉; pinyin: Liújí Xiāng) is a township of Yucheng County in eastern Henan province, China, located about 7 kilometres (4.3 mi) south of the border with Shandong and 20 km (12 mi) northeast of the county seat. As of 2011, it has 23 villages under its administration.

== See also ==
- List of township-level divisions of Henan
