= Xianping Subdistrict =

Xianping Subdistrict 咸平街道
- Subdistrict
- Location in Henan
- Coordinates: 34°28′37″N 114°28′19″E
- Country: China
- Province: Henan
- Prefecture-level city: Kaifeng
- County: Tongxu County
- Time zone: UTC+8 (China Standard Time)

Xianping Subdistrict (Chinese: 咸平街道; pinyin: Xiánpíng Jiēdào) is a subdistrict under the jurisdiction of Tongxu County, Henan Province, People's Republic of China. As of 2020, it administers the following 18 residential communities:

- Diyi (First) Community (第一社区)
- Di'er (Second) Community (第二社区)
- Disan (Third) Community (第三社区)
- Disi (Fourth) Community (第四社区)
- Diwu (Fifth) Community (第五社区)
- Xiawa Community (下洼社区)
- Zhaohe Community (赵河社区)
- Jinyuan Community (金元社区)
- Miaogang Community (苗岗社区)
- Xinggang Community (邢岗社区)
- Dongshuiwo Community (东水沃社区)
- Maozhuang Community (毛庄社区)
- Liuzhuang Community (刘庄社区)
- Wulibu Community (五里卜社区)
- Gaozhai Community (高寨社区)
- Yicun Community (一村社区)
- Ercun Community (二村社区)
- Daizhuang Community (代庄社区)

== See also ==
- List of township-level divisions of Henan
