= MQU =

MQU or mqu may refer to:

- MQU, the IATA code for Mariquita Airport, Colombia
- MQU, the Pinyin code for Minquan railway station, Shangqiu, Henan, China
- mqu, the ISO 639-3 code for Mandari dialect, South Sudan
