= Zhanggong, Henan =

Zhanggong 张弓镇
- Town
- Location in Henan
- Coordinates: 34°20′35″N 115°14′25″E
- Country: People's Republic of China
- Province: Henan
- Prefecture-level city: Shangqiu
- County: Ningling County
- Time zone: UTC+8 (China Standard)

Zhanggong (simplified Chinese: 张弓; traditional Chinese: 張弓; pinyin: Zhānggōng) is a town under the administration of Ningling County, Henan, China. As of 2018, it has 27 villages under its administration.
