= Yuchengxian railway station =

Railway station in Shangqiu, China

Yuchengxian 虞城县

General information
- Location: Central section of Chezhan Road; Yucheng County, Shangqiu, Henan; China
- Coordinates: 34.4084°N 115.8590°E
- Operator: CR Shanghai
- Line: Longhai railway
- Platforms: 3 (1 side platform and 1 island platform)

Other information
- Station code: 38693 (TMIS code); IXH (telegraph code); YCX (Pinyin code)
- Classification: Class 3 station (三等站)

History
- Opened: 1915
- Former names: Mamuji (Chinese: 马牧集)

Services
Preceding station	China Railway	Following station
Xiayixian towards Lianyungang East	Longhai railway	Shangqiu towards Lanzhou
Location
- Location within Henan Location within China

Yuchengxian railway station (Chinese: 虞城县站, literally "Yucheng County railway station") is a station on Longhai railway in Yucheng County, Shangqiu, Henan.

== History ==
The station was established in 1915.
