= Yingtian Fu =

Yingtian Fu may refer to:

- Yingtian (Song dynasty) (应天府), ancient name of Shangqiu in Song dynasty
- Yingtian (Ming dynasty) (应天府), ancient name of Nanjing in Ming dynasty
