= YCX =

YCX may refer to:

- CFB Gagetown (IATA: YCX), a large Canadian Forces Base in southwestern New Brunswick, Canada
- Yuchengxian railway station (Pinyin code: YCX), a railway station in Yucheng County, Shangqiu, Henan, China
