= Shaogang, Henan =

Shaogang 稍岗镇
- Town
- Location in Henan
- Coordinates: 34°25′40″N 115°58′26″E
- Country: People's Republic of China
- Province: Henan
- Prefecture-level city: Shangqiu
- County: Yucheng County
- Time zone: UTC+8 (China Standard)

Shaogang (simplified Chinese: 稍岗; traditional Chinese: 稍崗; pinyin: Shāogāng) is a town under the administration of Yucheng County, Henan, China. As of 2018, it has 43 villages under its administration.
