= Dangshan railway station =

Railway station in Suzhou, Anhui, China

Dangshan 砀山

General information
- Location: 1 Zhanqian Road; Dangshan County, Suzhou, Anhui; China
- Coordinates: 34.4179°N 116.3248°E
- Operator: CR Shanghai
- Line: Longhai railway
- Platforms: 3 (1 side platform and 1 island platform)

Other information
- Station code: 38675 (TMIS code); DKH (telegraph code); DSH (Pinyin code)
- Classification: Class 2 station (二等站)

History
- Opened: 1915

Services
Preceding station	China Railway	Following station
Huangkou towards Lianyungang East	Longhai railway	Xiayixian towards Lanzhou
Location

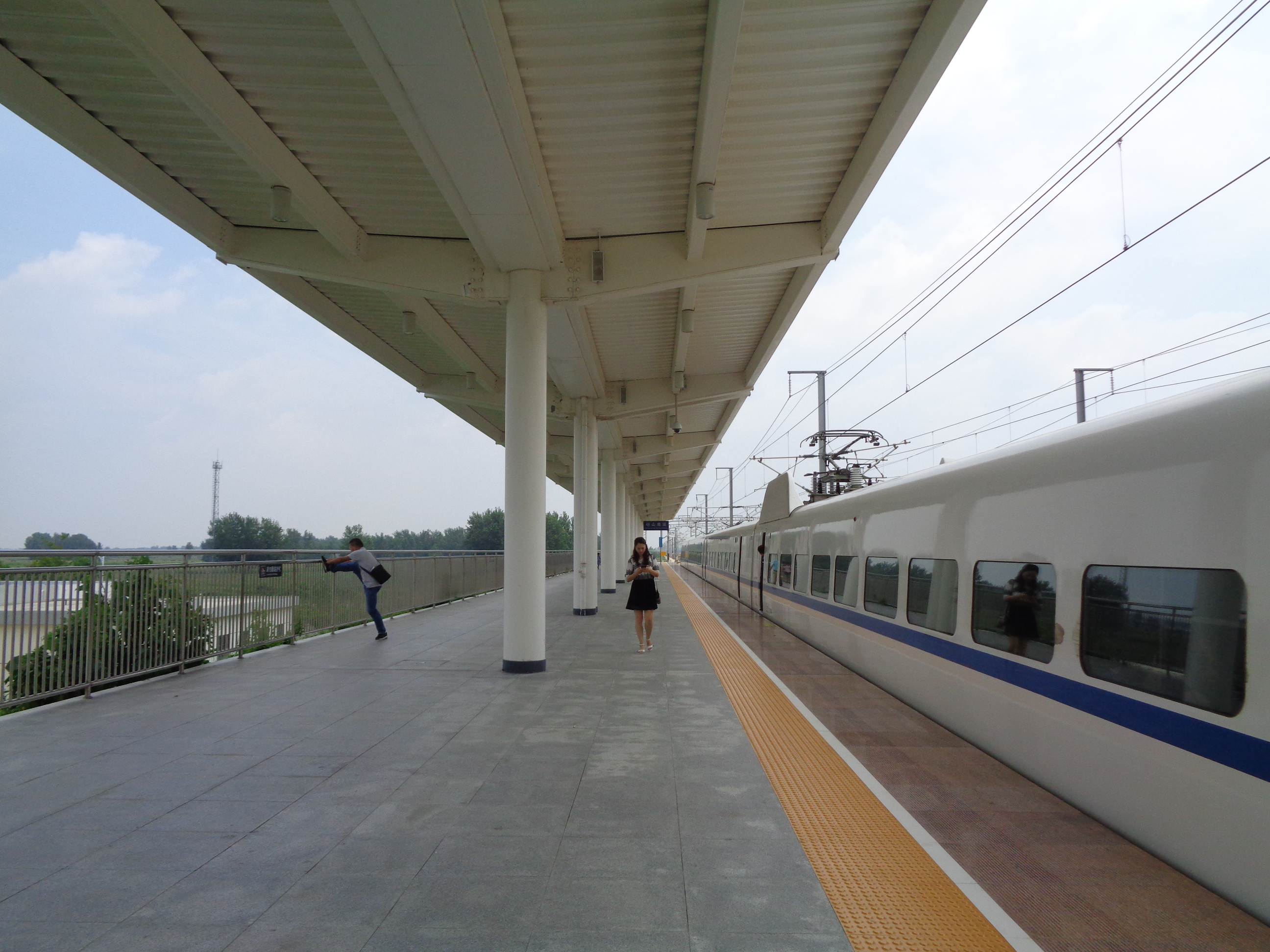
Dangshan South Station

Dangshan railway station (Chinese: 砀山站) is a station on the Longhai railway in Dangshan County, Suzhou, Anhui.

== History ==
The station was established in 1915.
