= Huangkou railway station =

Railway station in Suzhou, Anhui, China

Huangkou 黄口

General information
- Location: Southern section of Renmin Road; Huangkou Town, Xiao County, Suzhou, Anhui; China
- Coordinates: 34.3611°N 116.6922°E
- Operator: CR Shanghai
- Line: Longhai railway
- Platforms: 3 (1 side platform and 1 island platform)

Other information
- Station code: 38663 (TMIS code); KOH (telegraph code); HKO (Pinyin code)
- Classification: Class 4 station (四等站)

History
- Opened: 1915

Services
Preceding station	China Railway	Following station
Xuzhou towards Lianyungang East	Longhai railway	Dangshan towards Lanzhou
Location

Huangkou railway station (Chinese: 黄口站) is a station on Longhai railway in Xiao County, Suzhou, Anhui.

== History ==
The station was established in 1915.
