= Shuangta Township, Henan =

Shuangta Township 双塔乡
- Township
- Location in Henan
- Coordinates: 34°43′25″N 114°54′39″E
- Country: People's Republic of China
- Province: Henan
- Prefecture-level city: Shangqiu
- County: Minquan
- Elevation: 64 m (210 ft)
- Time zone: UTC+8 (China Standard)

Shuangta Township (simplified Chinese: 双塔乡; traditional Chinese: 雙塔鄉; pinyin: Shuāngtǎ Xiāng; lit. 'double tower') is a township of Minquan County in northeastern Henan province, China, situated along China National Highway 310 and just north of G30 Lianyungang–Khorgas Expressway about 23 kilometres (14 mi) west-northwest of the county seat. As of 2011, it has 28 villages under its administration. The township is also part of the border between the prefecture-level cities of Shangqiu and Kaifeng.

== See also ==
- List of township-level divisions of Henan
