= Suiyang, Shangqiu =

Suiyang 睢阳区
- District
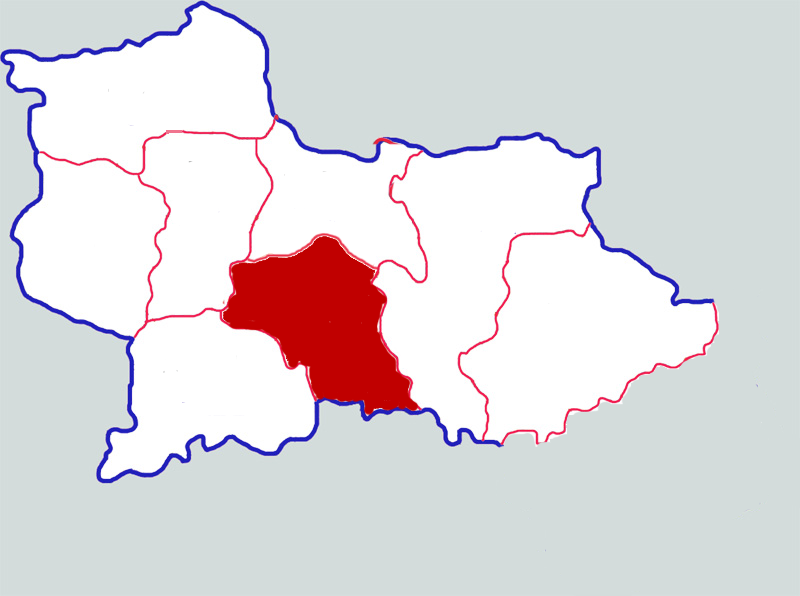
- Location in Shangqiu

- Location of the seat in Henan
- Coordinates: 34°23′17″N 115°39′11″E
- Country: People's Republic of China
- Province: Henan
- Prefecture-level city: Shangqiu

Area
  - Total: 913 km^{2} (353 sq mi)

Population (2019)
  - Total: 860,400
  - Density: 942/km^{2} (2,440/sq mi)
- Time zone: UTC+8 (China Standard)
- Postal code: 476000

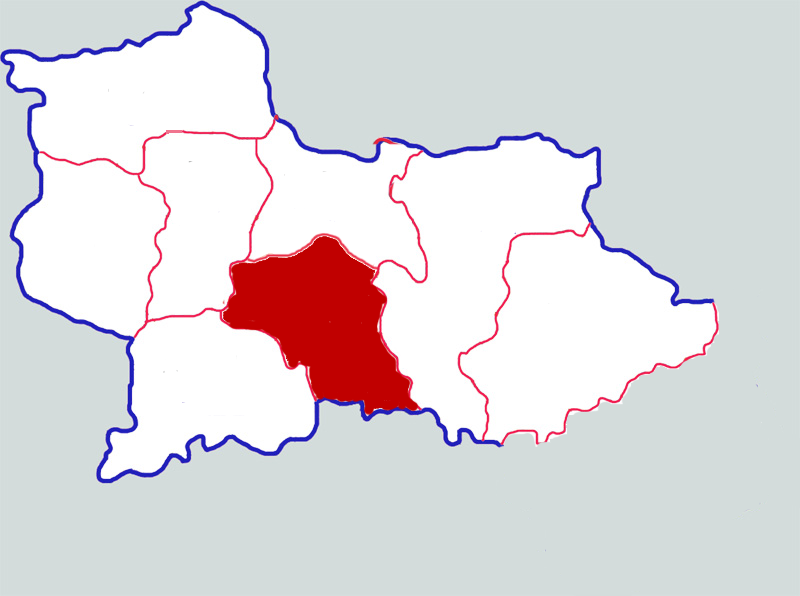
Location of Suiyang district in Shangqiu city, China

Suiyang District (simplified Chinese: 睢阳区; traditional Chinese: 睢陽區; pinyin: Suīyáng Qū) is one of the two districts of the city of Shangqiu, Henan, China. The district was established in 1997. "Suiyang" is a historical name of the Shangqiu city.

== Administrative divisions ==
As of 2012, this district is divided to 4 subdistricts, 4 towns and 10 townships.

Subdistricts

- Gucheng Subdistrict (古城街道)
- Wenhua Subdistrict (文化街道)
- Dongfang Subdistrict (东方街道)
- Xincheng Subdistrict (新城街道)

Towns

- Songji (宋集镇)
- Guocun (郭村镇)
- Likou (李口镇)
- Gaoxin (高辛镇)

Townships

- Gusong Township (古宋乡)
- Yanji Township (阎集乡)
- Fengqiao Township (冯桥乡)
- Wuqiang Township (坞墙乡)
- Baogongmiao Township (包公庙乡)
- Loudian Township (娄店乡)
- Maogudui Township (毛堌堆乡)
- Luhe Township (路河乡)
- Lema Township (勒马乡)
- Linhedian Township (临河店乡)
