= Shaogang Township =

Shaogang Township 邵岗乡
- Township
- Location in China
- Coordinates: 32°18′24″N 116°8′12″E
- Country: People's Republic of China
- Province: Anhui
- Prefecture-level city: Lu'an
- County: Huoqiu County
- Time zone: UTC+8 (China Standard)

Shaogang Township (simplified Chinese: 邵岗乡; traditional Chinese: 邵崗鄉; pinyin: Shàogāng Xiāng) is a township under the administration of Huoqiu County, Anhui, China. As of 2018, it has 9 villages under its administration.
