= Zhenguan =

Zhenguan may refer to:

- Zhenguan (斟灌), an ancient Chinese state during the Xia dynasty before 2010 BC, located in approximately modern Shouguang, Shandong

== Historical eras ==
- Zhenguan (貞觀, 627–649), era name used by Emperor Taizong of Tang
- Zhenguan (貞觀, 1101–1113), era name used by Emperor Chongzong of Western Xia
