= Lankao railway station =

Railway station in Kaifeng, China

Lankao 兰考
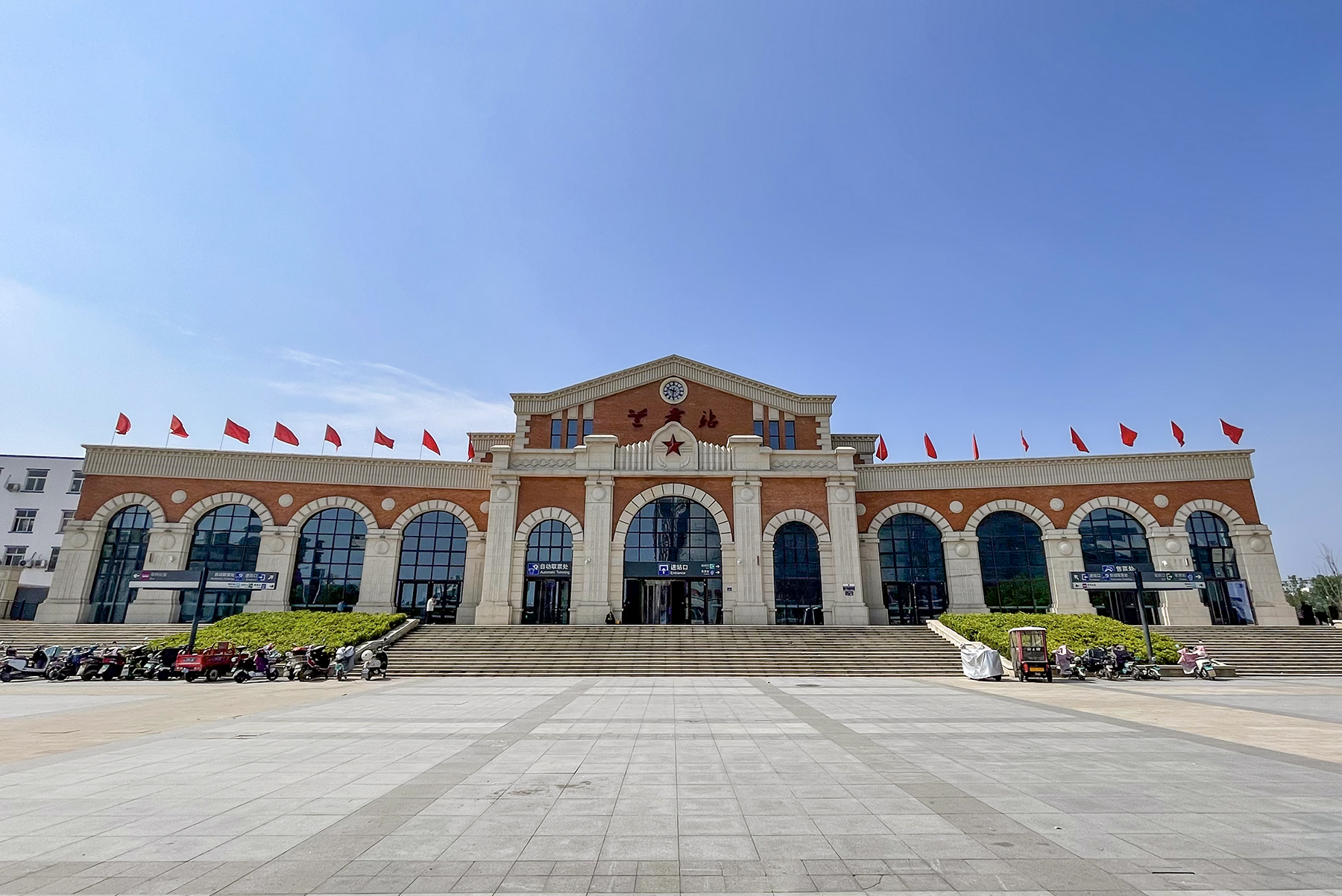
- Exterior

General information
- Location: Middle section of Chezhan Road; Lankao County, Kaifeng, Henan; China
- Coordinates: 34.8158°N 114.8139°E
- Operator: CR Zhengzhou
- Line: Longhai railway
- Connections: Bus terminal

Other information
- Station code: 38750 (TMIS code); LKF (telegraph code); LKA (Pinyin code)
- Classification: Class 3 station (三等站)

History
- Opened: 1915
- Former names: Lancun (Chinese: 兰村)

Services
Preceding station	China Railway	Following station
Minquan towards Lianyungang East	Longhai railway	Kaifeng towards Lanzhou
Location
- Location within Henan Location within China

Lankao railway station (Chinese: 兰考站) is a station on Longhai railway in Lankao County, Kaifeng, Henan.

== History ==
The station was established in 1915 as Lancun railway station (Chinese: 兰村站).

The station was renamed to the current name in 1954 when Lanfeng County and Kaocheng County merged to form Lankao County.

== See also ==
- Lankao South railway station
