= Shuangta, Pulandian =

Shuangta 双塔镇
- Town
- Location in Liaoning
- Coordinates: 39°46′05″N 122°28′03″E
- Country: People's Republic of China
- Province: Liaoning
- Sub-provincial city: Dalian
- County-level city: Pulandian
- Elevation: 32 m (105 ft)
- Time zone: UTC+8 (China Standard)
- Area code: 0411

Shuangta (simplified Chinese: 双塔; traditional Chinese: 雙塔; pinyin: Shuāngtǎ; lit. 'double tower') is a town under the administration of Pulandian City in southern Liaoning province, China, located 58 kilometres (36 mi) northeast of downtown Pulandian and about 120 km (75 mi) northeast of Dalian. As of 2011, it has 9 villages under its administration.

== See also ==
- List of township-level divisions of Liaoning
