= Shaogang, Ningxia =

Shaogang 邵岗镇
- Town
- Location in Ningxia
- Coordinates: 38°9′30″N 106°3′58″E
- Country: People's Republic of China
- Autonomous region: Ningxia
- Prefecture-level city: Wuzhong
- County-level city: Qingtongxia
- Time zone: UTC+8 (China Standard)

Shaogang (simplified Chinese: 邵岗; traditional Chinese: 邵崗; pinyin: Shàogāng) is a town under the administration of Qingtongxia, Ningxia, China. As of 2018, it has one residential community and 15 villages under its administration.
