= Xiayi County =

Xiayi County 夏邑县 Siayi
- County
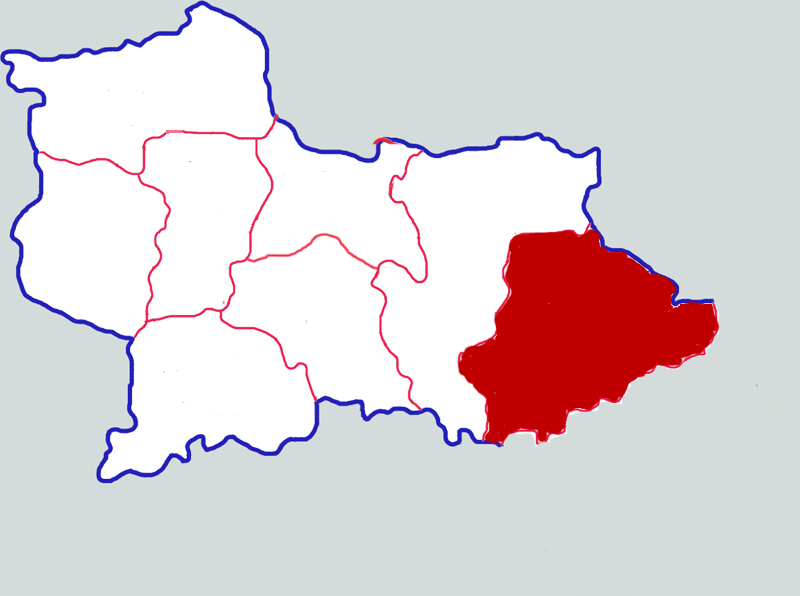
- Location in Shangqiu

- Location of the seat in Henan
- Coordinates: 34°14′17″N 116°07′52″E
- Country: People's Republic of China
- Province: Henan
- Prefecture-level city: Shangqiu

Area
  - Total: 1,470 km^{2} (570 sq mi)

Population (2019)
  - Total: 865,100
  - Density: 589/km^{2} (1,520/sq mi)
- Time zone: UTC+8 (China Standard)
- Postal code: 476400

Xiayi County (Chinese: 夏邑县; pinyin: Xiàyì Xiàn) is a county of the prefecture-level city of Shangqiu, Henan province, People's Republic of China, bordering Anhui province to the northeast and southwest. It has a population of about 1.11 million.

== Administrative divisions ==
As of 2012, this county is divided to 8 towns and 16 townships.

Towns

- Chengguan (城关镇)
- Huiting (会亭镇)
- Matou (马头镇)
- Jiyang (济阳镇)
- Liji (李集镇)
- Chezhan (车站镇)
- Yangji (杨集镇)
- Handaokou (韩道口镇)

Townships

- Caoji Township (曹集乡)
- Huqiao Township (胡桥乡)
- Qihe Township (歧河乡)
- Guodian Township (郭店乡)
- Yemiao Township (业庙乡)
- Zhongfeng Township (中峰乡)
- Luozhuang Township (罗庄乡)
- Sanggu Township (桑固乡)
- Heying Township (何营乡)
- Wangji Township (王集乡)
- Liudianji Township (刘店集乡)
- Luoji Township (骆集乡)
- Taiping Township (太平乡)
- Kongzhuang Township (孔庄乡)
- Huodian Township (火店乡)
- Beizhen Township (北镇乡)

== Climate ==
Climate data for Xiayi, elevation 43 m (141 ft), (1991–2020 normals, extremes 1981–present)
Month	Jan	Feb	Mar	Apr	May	Jun	Jul	Aug	Sep	Oct	Nov	Dec	Year
Record high °C (°F)	17.2 (63.0)	24.6 (76.3)	32.0 (89.6)	34.0 (93.2)	37.5 (99.5)	40.4 (104.7)	39.7 (103.5)	38.3 (100.9)	36.5 (97.7)	35.5 (95.9)	27.7 (81.9)	20.5 (68.9)	40.4 (104.7)
Mean daily maximum °C (°F)	5.7 (42.3)	9.3 (48.7)	15.7 (60.3)	21.6 (70.9)	27.1 (80.8)	31.3 (88.3)	32.0 (89.6)	31.0 (87.8)	27.2 (81.0)	22.3 (72.1)	14.1 (57.4)	7.9 (46.2)	20.4 (68.8)
Daily mean °C (°F)	0.5 (32.9)	3.9 (39.0)	9.8 (49.6)	15.5 (59.9)	21.2 (70.2)	25.4 (77.7)	27.2 (81.0)	26.2 (79.2)	21.4 (70.5)	15.9 (60.6)	8.6 (47.5)	2.4 (36.3)	14.8 (58.7)
Mean daily minimum °C (°F)	−3.5 (25.7)	−0.3 (31.5)	4.6 (40.3)	9.7 (49.5)	15.7 (60.3)	20.3 (68.5)	23.5 (74.3)	22.6 (72.7)	17.1 (62.8)	10.9 (51.6)	4.1 (39.4)	−1.8 (28.8)	10.2 (50.4)
Record low °C (°F)	−15.0 (5.0)	−17.5 (0.5)	−6.9 (19.6)	−3.0 (26.6)	3.4 (38.1)	10.5 (50.9)	16.8 (62.2)	13.5 (56.3)	5.5 (41.9)	−1.5 (29.3)	−8.9 (16.0)	−17.4 (0.7)	−17.5 (0.5)
Average precipitation mm (inches)	16.1 (0.63)	21.2 (0.83)	30.2 (1.19)	39.4 (1.55)	61.5 (2.42)	100.9 (3.97)	204.9 (8.07)	170.1 (6.70)	71.6 (2.82)	39.2 (1.54)	35.8 (1.41)	15.5 (0.61)	806.4 (31.74)
Average precipitation days (≥ 0.1 mm)	4.3	4.6	5.1	6.4	7.5	7.7	11.7	10.8	8.2	5.8	5.6	3.9	81.6
Average snowy days	3.2	2.2	0.8	0	0	0	0	0	0	0	0.6	1.6	8.4
Average relative humidity (%)	69	65	63	66	69	69	81	84	80	73	72	70	72
Mean monthly sunshine hours	121.6	129.2	166.3	192.3	203.0	187.0	173.2	170.4	156.2	158.5	136.6	127.5	1,921.8
Percentage possible sunshine	39	41	45	49	47	43	40	41	43	46	44	42	43
Source: China Meteorological Administration
