= Yucheng County =

Yucheng County 虞城县
- County
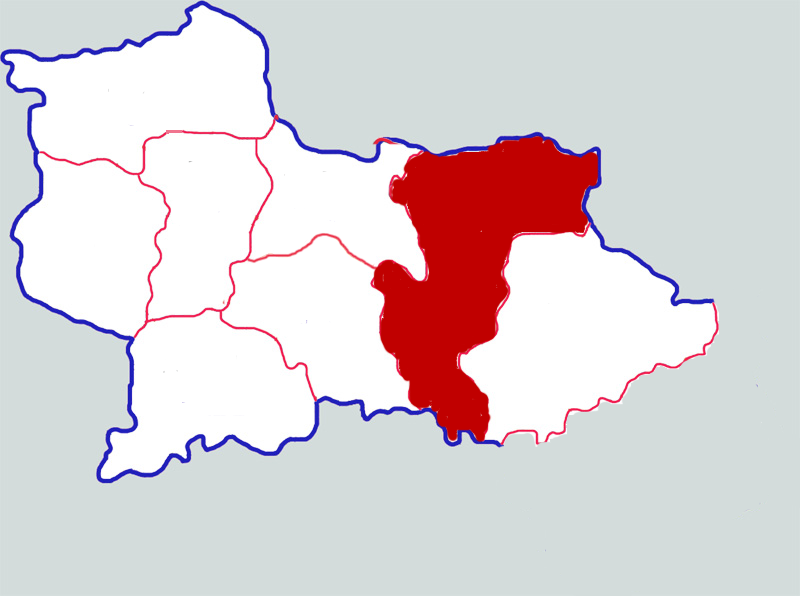
- Location in Shangqiu

- Location of the seat in Henan
- Coordinates: 34°24′09″N 115°50′26″E
- Country: People's Republic of China
- Province: Henan
- Prefecture-level city: Shangqiu

Area
  - Total: 1,558 km^{2} (602 sq mi)

Population (2019)
  - Total: 826,500
  - Density: 530.5/km^{2} (1,374/sq mi)
- Postal code: 476300
- Area code: 0370

Yucheng County (Chinese: 虞城县; pinyin: Yúchéng Xiàn) is a county located in the east of Henan province, People's Republic of China, affiliated to Shangqiu City, it is 47.5 kilometers wide from east to west, 67.6 kilometers long from north to south, with an area of 1485 square kilometers. It is adjacent to Liangyuan Park, Shangqiu New District and Yuyang District, bordering the provinces of Shandong to the north and Anhui to the south. It is under the administration of the prefecture-level city of Shangqiu, with a population of approximately 1.08 million and an area of 601.547 square miles (1,558.0 km^{2}). According to preliminary statistics, in 2017, the gross domestic product (GDP) of Lucheng County was 25.72 billion yuan, the total retail sales of social consumer goods was 8.26 billion yuan, the investment in fixed assets was 23.77 billion yuan, the per capita disposable income of urban residents was 25,718 yuan, and the per capita disposable income of rural residents was 10,338 yuan.

== History ==
It has been founded for over 1400 years and has a lot of historic sites, such as Yiyin grave and Weizheng grave. Yucheng is also the hometown of Hua Mulan, a well-known heroine of the Southern & Northern Dynasties. In 1949, Yucheng belonged to Shangqiu District of Henan Province. In 1958, Shangqiu and Kaifeng II were merged and belonged to Kaifeng. In 1961, Shangqiu District was re-established (renamed Shangqiu District in 1969), Shangqiu City was established in 1997, and Qiucheng City was in Shangqiu City.

== Administrative divisions ==
As of 2012, this county is divided to 10 towns and 16 townships.

Towns

- Chengguan (城关镇)
- Jiegou (界沟镇)
- Yingguo (营郭镇)
- Duji (杜集镇)
- Gushu (谷熟镇)
- Dayangji (大杨集镇)
- Jiazhai (贾寨镇)
- Limin (利民镇)
- Zhangji (张集镇)
- Shaogang (稍岗镇)

Townships

- Huangzhong Township (黄冢乡)
- Shaji Township (沙集乡)
- Dianji Township (店集乡)
- Zhanji Township (站集乡)
- Wenji Township (闻集乡)
- Mangzhongqiao Township (芒种桥乡)
- Liudian Township (刘店乡)
- Dahou Township (大候乡)
- Chengjiao Township (城郊乡)
- Zhengji Township (郑集乡)
- Lilaojia Township (李老家乡)
- Zhenligu Township (镇里固乡)
- Guwangji Township (古王集乡)
- Liuji Township (刘集乡)
- Qiaoji Township (乔集乡)
- Tianmiao Township (田庙乡)

== Economy ==
In 2017, the gross domestic product (GDP) of Yucheng County was 25.72 billion yuan, the total retail sales of social consumer goods was 8.26 billion yuan, the investment in fixed assets was 23.77 billion yuan, the per capita disposable income of urban residents was 25,718 yuan, and the per capita disposable income of rural residents was 10,338 yuan. The balance of institutional deposits was 24.46 billion yuan, the balance of various loans was 9.48 billion yuan, and the tax revenue accounted for more than 70% of the general budget revenue.

In 2017, the agricultural production in Yucheng County increased steadily. The county's total grain output reached 1.1 billion kilograms. The number of professional households of various types has grown to 14,000, and the number of specialized breeding villages has grown to 226.

Yucheng County vigorously promoted the process of agricultural industrialization, and gradually developed into the scale of famous products, the base of commodity production, the network of science and technology services, the serialization of social services, and the modernization of rural economy.

Yucheng is located in the hinterland of the wheat producing area of Huanghuai Plain, and the wheat raw materials are sufficient. In order to make the flour business bigger and stronger, there are more than 20 flour enterprises; among them, Xinwang Flour Co., Ltd., Xingwang Food Co., Ltd., Group Friends Food Co., Ltd., Guangnaili Flour Co., Ltd., Chunfa Food Co., Ltd., Dongfeng Flour Co., Ltd. Company, Xinfeng Flour Co., Ltd., Huayu Flour Co., Ltd. has a daily output of more than 200 tons. It is a large domestic flour processing enterprise, creating a one-stop production, processing, sales and food production.

In addition to the agricultural economy, in 2017, the industrial economy of Yucheng County grew steadily. It is estimated that the total industrial output value of the whole year will reach 50.86 billion yuan. The added value of industrial enterprises above designated size ranks first in the city. Was rated as "National Food Industry Strong County"

There are more than 500 agricultural and sideline products processing enterprises in Yucheng County. Among them, Cody Group is a national agricultural industrialization leading enterprise, with 50,000 tons of canned food, 50,000 tons of instant noodles, 50,000 tons of frozen food, and 100,000 tons of fresh milk. The advantages of rich by-product resources.

In 2010, Yucheng County was identified as a county labor station in the province. The construction and improvement of rural circulation channels has been effectively implemented, effectively solving the problem of farmers being difficult to sell. In the past five years, 524 farmer shops have been reconstructed, covering more than 80% of the county's administrative villages. The sales volume of home appliances to the countryside in 2010 was 150,000 units (pieces), which was 11 times that of the year when the home appliances went to the countryside in 2008. Using information technology to promote sales of agricultural products, online sales in 2010 were nearly 800 million yuan, 37 times that of the launch of the online matchmaking conference in 2006. In 2010, the total retail sales of consumer goods reached 3.38 billion yuan, twice that of 2005. The average annual growth rate is 17.3%.

== Population ==
In the fifth population census in 2000, the total population of Yucheng County was 1,102,261.

By the end of 2014, there were 355,000 households in Yucheng County, with a total registered population of 1,183,800 and a permanent resident population of 888,500, of which the urban population was 286,500.

== Climate ==
Yucheng County is located in the middle latitude and belongs to the semi-humid semi-arid continental monsoon climate in the eastern warm temperate zone with four distinct seasons. The climate change is remarkable, the spring is warm and windy, the summer is hot and rainy, the autumn is cool and warm, and the winter is cold and dry. The annual average wind speed is 3.1 m/s, the annual average temperature is 14.1 °C, and the average annual precipitation is 726.5 mm.

Climate data for Yucheng, elevation 46 m (151 ft), (1991–2020 normals, extremes 1981–present)
Month	Jan	Feb	Mar	Apr	May	Jun	Jul	Aug	Sep	Oct	Nov	Dec	Year
Record high °C (°F)	17.1 (62.8)	25.7 (78.3)	30.6 (87.1)	33.4 (92.1)	38.6 (101.5)	39.9 (103.8)	39.7 (103.5)	37.3 (99.1)	35.8 (96.4)	34.9 (94.8)	27.8 (82.0)	20.7 (69.3)	39.9 (103.8)
Mean daily maximum °C (°F)	5.4 (41.7)	9.2 (48.6)	14.8 (58.6)	21.2 (70.2)	26.6 (79.9)	31.6 (88.9)	31.9 (89.4)	30.6 (87.1)	27.1 (80.8)	22.0 (71.6)	14.1 (57.4)	7.4 (45.3)	20.2 (68.3)
Daily mean °C (°F)	0.0 (32.0)	3.3 (37.9)	8.6 (47.5)	14.8 (58.6)	20.4 (68.7)	25.3 (77.5)	27.1 (80.8)	25.8 (78.4)	21.1 (70.0)	15.3 (59.5)	7.9 (46.2)	1.9 (35.4)	14.3 (57.7)
Mean daily minimum °C (°F)	−4.0 (24.8)	−1.3 (29.7)	3.2 (37.8)	8.8 (47.8)	14.4 (57.9)	19.7 (67.5)	23.2 (73.8)	22.1 (71.8)	16.4 (61.5)	10.1 (50.2)	3.1 (37.6)	−2.3 (27.9)	9.5 (49.0)
Record low °C (°F)	−15.4 (4.3)	−16.6 (2.1)	−8.5 (16.7)	−4.4 (24.1)	2.8 (37.0)	10.4 (50.7)	16.6 (61.9)	11.3 (52.3)	4.5 (40.1)	−1.4 (29.5)	−15.7 (3.7)	−18.4 (−1.1)	−18.4 (−1.1)
Average precipitation mm (inches)	13.2 (0.52)	18.3 (0.72)	25.9 (1.02)	38.3 (1.51)	64.4 (2.54)	86.6 (3.41)	181.0 (7.13)	165.3 (6.51)	68.1 (2.68)	39.3 (1.55)	33.5 (1.32)	13.8 (0.54)	747.7 (29.45)
Average precipitation days (≥ 0.1 mm)	4.1	4.7	5.1	5.8	7.1	7.5	11.1	10.2	8.0	5.7	5.5	4.0	78.8
Average snowy days	3.3	2.7	1.1	0.1	0	0	0	0	0	0	0.7	1.8	9.7
Average relative humidity (%)	69	67	66	70	71	68	81	85	81	74	74	71	73
Mean monthly sunshine hours	131.2	141.4	182.2	205.9	225.0	203.9	192.4	182.5	171.8	168.1	145.8	137.2	2,087.4
Percentage possible sunshine	42	45	49	52	52	47	44	44	47	49	47	45	47
Source: China Meteorological Administration

== Transportation ==
Yucheng County is located in the central part of China, with a superior geographical environment and many railways passing through here. The Bohai Railway, 310 National Highway, Lianhuo Expressway, Yu 36 Highway and Yu 04 Highway cross the east and west, and the Beijing-Kowloon Railway, Shangyu Expressway, 105 National Highway and Yu-203 Highway run through the north and south. There are 4 railway stations in the county.

- Beijing-Kowloon Railway: Beijing to Kowloon
- Longhai Railway: Lanzhou to Lianyungang
- Lianhuo Expressway: Lianyungang to Khorgos
- Jiguang Expressway: Jinan to Guangzhou
- Xinshang Expressway: Zhengzhou Xinzheng International Airport to Shangqiu Junmin Airport
- National Highway 105: G105 Beijing to Zhuhai
- National Highway 310: G310 Lianyungang to Tianshui
- Jiyu Expressway: Jining to Tuen Mun
- Yongdeng Expressway: Yongcheng to Dengfeng

== Tourism ==
The culture of Luancheng County from ancient times to the present has left a wealth of tourism resources for Yucheng.

Mulanyu is located in Dazhouzhuang Village, Yingjiao Town, 35 km south of Yucheng County, 35 km from Yucheng County and 2.5 km from Mulan Station of Beijing-Kowloon Railway.

Shangjun Tomb is located in the southwestern Shangdu Tomb Village, Limin Town, Yucheng County. It is located in the southwest of Yangzhuang Village, Limin Town, 12.5 km north of Yucheng County. The tomb has a residual height of 4 meters, a circumference of 110 meters and an area of 960 square meters.

Yi Yin's tomb is located three kilometers south of Gushu Town, Yucheng County, which is Weitundui Village, the village of Jicheng County. Before the construction of the ancestral hall, after the cemetery, there is a flower theater building 100 meters south of the front of the ancestral hall. The ancestral hall faces the south and the flower theater building faces the north. The tomb is 3 meters high and 50 meters in circumference, surrounded by a cypress. Cooper has a history of more than 1,400 years, the largest diameter of more than 3 meters. Every year in the second day of the second lunar month and the beginning of September, there are ancient gatherings in the village of Weiwei, and on the day of the ancient festival, the neighboring Shangqiu, the villagers of Anhui, Shandong and Jiangsu have come to visit the tomb.
