= Liangyuan =

Liangyuan was a large garden built by Liu Wu, Prince Xiao of Liang during the Western Han dynasty, east of Suiyang, the capital of the Liang Kingdom (present-day Shangqiu, Henan Province). Prominent literary figures, including Mei Sheng, Sima Xiangru, Zou Yang, and Yan Ji, were guests at his court and composed literary works under his patronage, contributing to the rise of Fu poetry.

== Names ==
The Records of the Grand Historian refers to the garden as the "Eastern Villa" (東苑), while the Miscellaneous Records of the Western Capital calls it the "Rabbit Villa" (兔園 / 菟園). Wang Bo referred to it as the "Sui Villa" (Suiyuan, 睢園) in his Preface to the Pavilion of Prince Teng, after the nearby Sui River. In later periods, it was also commonly known as "Liang Villa" (Liangyuan, 梁園 / 梁苑).

== Liangyuan Literatures ==
The Miscellaneous Records of the Western Capital describes "palaces and pavilions joined, stretching tens of li", amid exotic fruits, rare trees, wondrous birds, and strange beasts. Prince Xiao daily hunted, shot, and fished there, accompanied by courtiers and guests. The Records of the Grand Historian further states that Prince Xiao "built the Eastern Villa, three hundred li across, and enlarged Suiyang by seventy li".

Mei Sheng's Fu on Prince Liang's Tu Villa depicts its splendour: "Tall bamboo, lush and graceful, flanks the waters, encircles Tu Villa, and lines the carriageways." The poem also mentions structures such as the "Zhicheng Palace towers".

Sima Xiangru once sojourned in Liang and composed the Fu on Master Vacuous. Only after Prince Xiao's death did Sima leave Liang.

At one banquet in the Hall of Forgotten Sorrows, Prince Xiao commanded his retainers each to compose a fu. Mei Sheng wrote Fu on the Willow; Lu Qiaoru, Fu on the Crane; Zou Yang, Fu on Wine; Gongsun Gui, Fu on the Patterned Deer; Yang Sheng, Fu on the Folding Screen; and Gongsun Cheng, Fu on the Moon. Mei Sheng's Fu on Prince Liang's Tu Villa later came to be regarded as a landmark in the formal establishment of Han fu.

=== Literary allusions ===
"Liangyuan" became poetic bywords for gatherings of scholars and poets. Thus Du Fu wrote, "Drunken dance through Liang Villa nights; singing wander through Sishui spring", and Li Bai, "Once I left the imperial capital; ten years a guest in Liang Villa". Many nobles and dignitaries likewise named their garden Liang Villa. Among them, Emperor Taizong of Tang's son Li Yun ordered his subordinate Du Sixian to compile the examination handbook Tuyuance. In later centuries, "Tuyuan" also served as a derisive term for elementary examination learning.

== Remains ==
The generally accepted site of Liangyuan lies in the eastern part of present-day Shangqiu, Henan Province. Although the garden itself has long vanished, several associated historical sites remain in the area, including Pingtai and Sanlingtai.
