= Minquan County =

Minquan County 民权县
- County
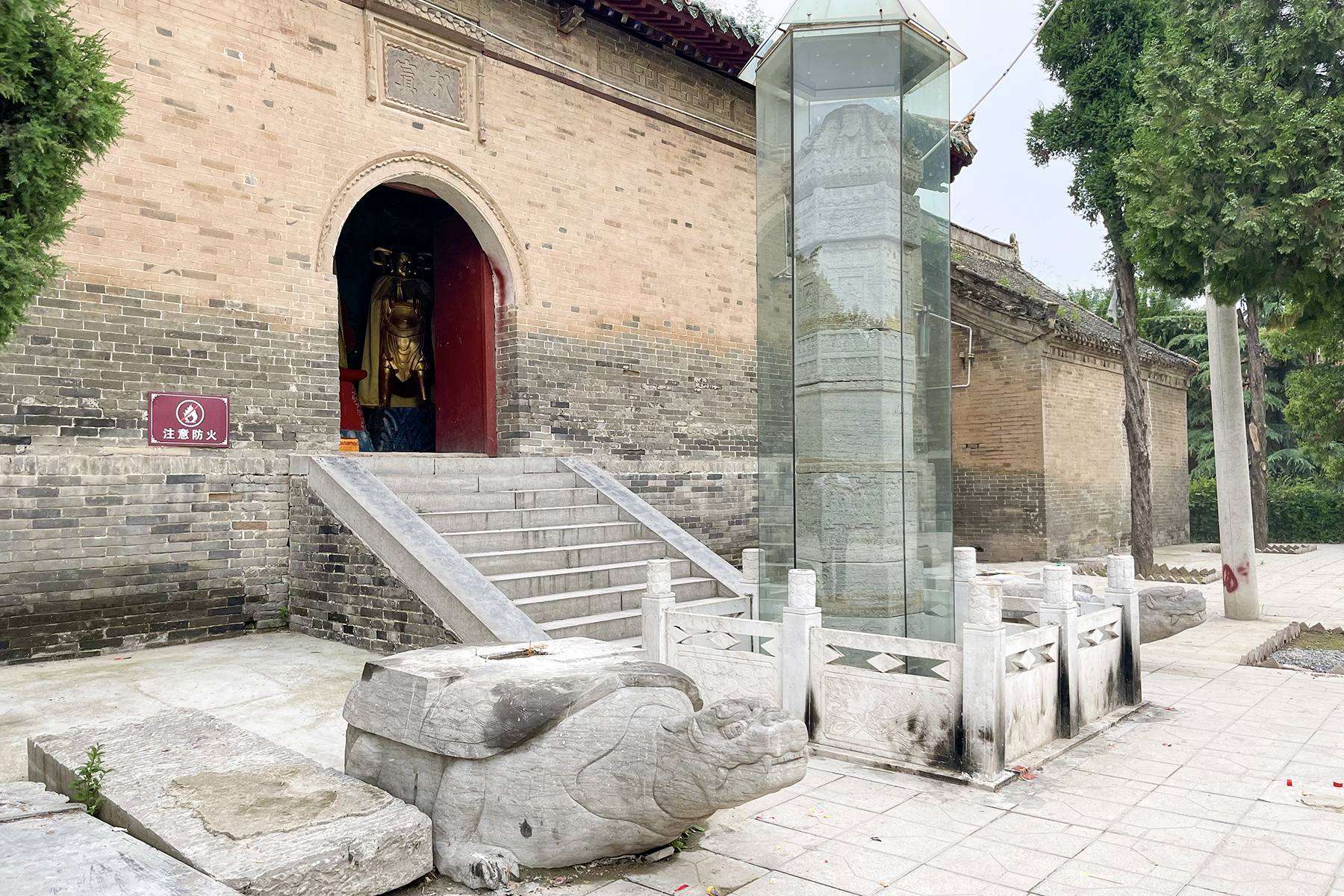
- Aerial view of Minquan Baiyun Temple Zhangzhuang Mosque Minquan Railway Station

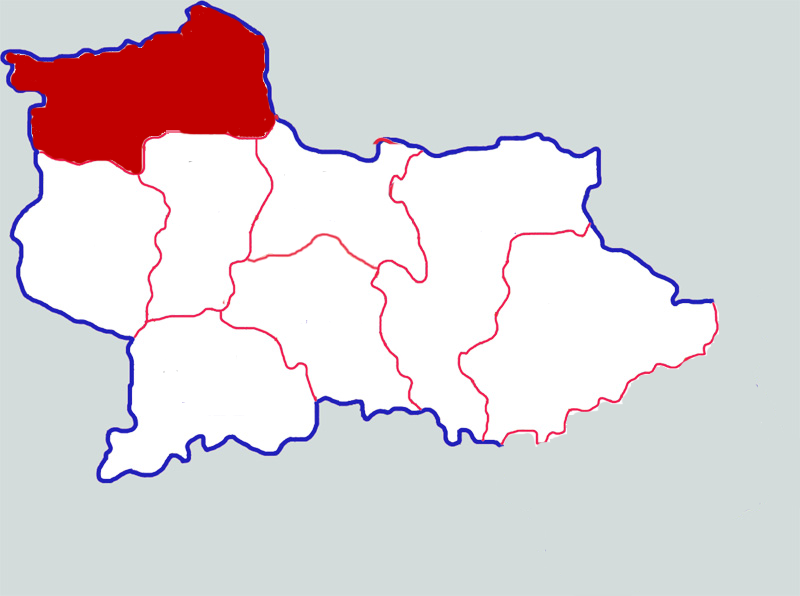
- Location in Shangqiu

- Location of the seat in Henan
- Coordinates: 34°38′53″N 115°10′48″E
- Country: People's Republic of China
- Province: Henan
- Prefecture-level city: Shangqiu

Area
  - Total: 1,222 km^{2} (472 sq mi)

Population (2019)
  - Total: 700,700
  - Density: 573.4/km^{2} (1,485/sq mi)
- Time zone: UTC+8 (China Standard)
- Postal code: 476800

Minquan County (simplified Chinese: 民权县; traditional Chinese: 民權縣; pinyin: Mínquán Xiàn) is a county in the east of Henan province, China, under the administration of the prefecture-level city of Shangqiu. It lies in the northwestern tip of Shangqiu and borders Shandong province to the east.

== History ==
=== Classical times ===
Located within the core of the historic Zhongyuan region, Minquan has some of China's longest recorded history along with the rest of Henan province.

During the Xia and Shang dynasties, the area was known as Daiyi (戴邑).

Under the Qin dynasty, it formed part of Waihuang County (外黄). Since then, the county's administrative status had gone through repeated changes. First abolished during the Northern Wei; then restored under the Sui dynasty, and abolished again during the Zhenguan era (贞观) of the Tang dynasty.

=== Modern times ===
The county's modern history is intricately linked to the early political history of the Republic of China. The region got connected to modern railway network after the construction of Libaji Station (李坝集站) in May 1915 alongside the Kaifeng-Xuzhou section of the Longhai Railway, and officially commenced operations in January 1916.

Zhangzhuang Mosque (大张庄清真寺), a 15th century mosque dedicated to the local Hui Muslim community

In 1928, shortly after the capture of Henan by the Guominjun as a part of campaign during Northern Expedition, Feng Yuxiang, then chairman of the Henan Provincial Government, decided to carve out three northern districts of Sui County (睢县) and five districts of Qi County (杞县), and merged them into a newly established county, naming it after the principle of minquan (lit. "people's rights"), one of the Three Principles of the People formulated by Sun Yat-sen.

In 1932, Minquan County was placed under the jurisdiction of Henan's Second Administrative Inspectorate, and in 1948 it was reassigned to the Twelfth Administrative Inspectorate, and in April 1948 it was reassigned to the Twelfth Administrative Inspectorate.

In May 1949, the county came under the Shangqiu Prefecture following its capture by the People's Liberation Army. When Shangqiu Prefecture was abolished in December 1958, Minquan was briefly transferred to Kaifeng Prefecture.

==== Winemaking Industry ====
Minquan County lies in the northeastern part of the eastern Henan plain, where the former course of the Yellow River crosses the county. Repeated flooding in earlier periods left extensive areas of sandy alluvial soil and numerous reservoirs. Combined with the county's temperate continental monsoon climate, these conditions proved suitable for viticulture.

In 1954, the state-owned Xianguo Farm in Minquan began planting grapes on large areas of sandy wasteland along the former Yellow River channel. The following year, the Beijing Winery attempted to purchase grapes from Minquan to supplement its raw material supply. Because of the long distancce and poor transport conditions, however, much of the shipment spoiled in transit. The incident contributed to a decision by the Ministry of Light Industry to establish a winery in Minquan itself.

The Minquan Winery was officially established in 1958. It was one of the earliest wineries in the People's Republic of China to be directly funded by the central government. By the early 1960s, its products had expanded from local sales to distribution across China.

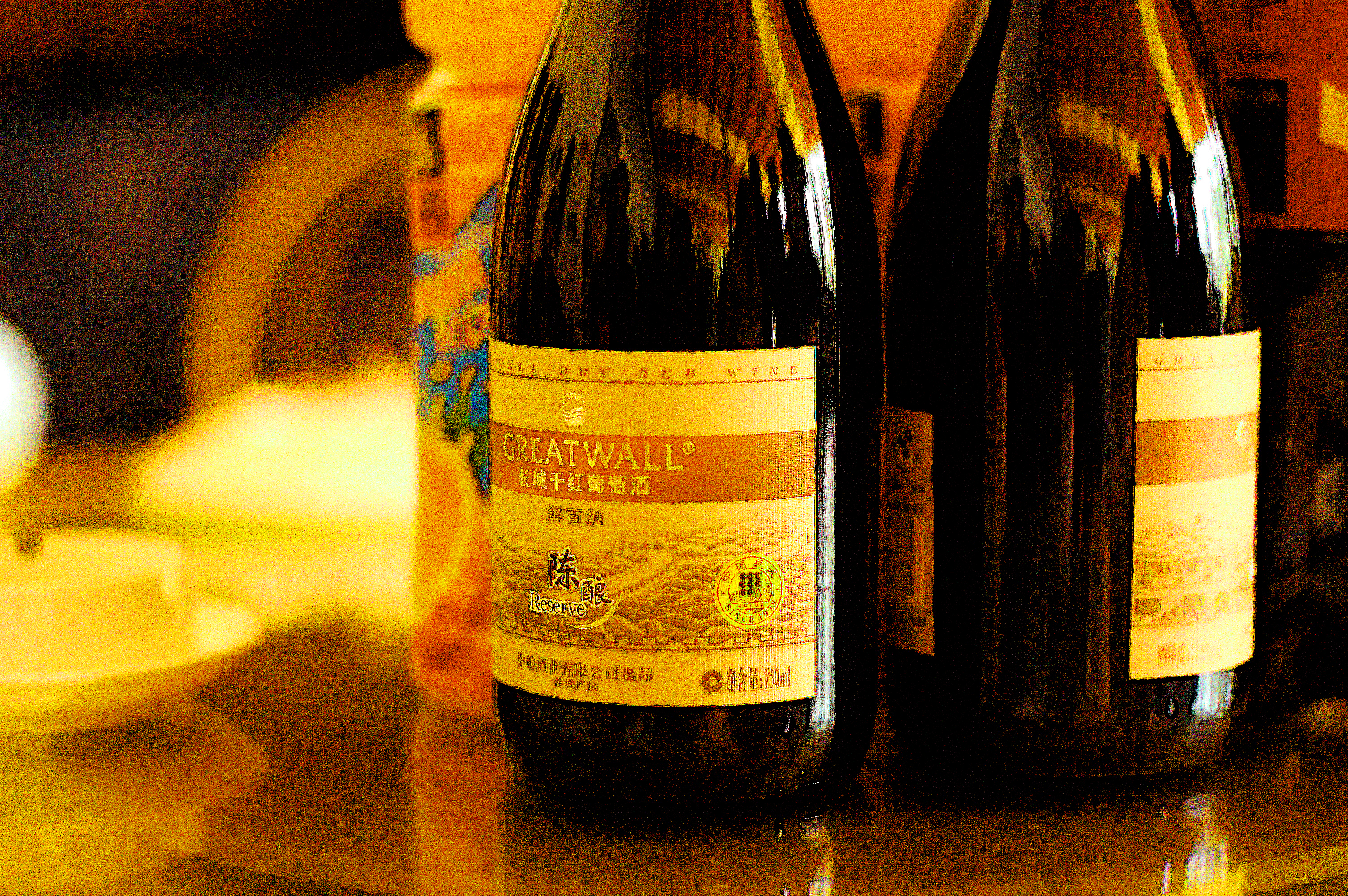
The Minquan-made wine under the trade mark of "Great Wall"

During the 1960s, the winery also began developing export markets. Because it did not initially possess independent export rights, it cooperated with the Tianjin Cereals, Oils and Foodstuffs Import and Export Corporation (天津粮油食品进出口公司) and registered the "Great Wall" trademark on its behalf. Minquan wines were subsequently exported through the Port of Tianjin to more than 20 countries and regions.

Minquan Winery's products had since then earned nationwide fame and recognition. In 1979, its "Great Wall" wine was designated as a "Famous Chinese Wine"; in 1982, it was recognized as a "National Quality Wine"; and in 1987, it received the Gold Award for "Famous and Special Chinese Export Products". By the 1990s, the winery had several products recognized at national, ministrial, and provincial levels, and its major technical and economic indicators ranked among the leading wine producers in China.

Former Site of Minquan Winery

The winery later entered a prolonged period of decline. In 1993, Minquan lost the right to use the "Great Wall" trademark and began using the "Minquan" brand in 1994. In 1997, Hong Kong-based Ng Fung Hong invested in the winery and formed Minquan Ng Fung Wine Co., holding a 51% stake, but the joint venture failed to reverse the company's losses. Ng Fung Hong began withdrawing in 2000. By February 2005, the company had accumulated losses of about 143 million yuan, and Minquan Ng Fung Wine Co. entered bankruptcy proceedings in March 2005.

The decline of the winery also affected local grape cultivation. Minquan had once had more than 60,000 mu (≈40 km²) of vineyards and had been listed as one of China's four major grape-growing base counties, but growers began removing wines as the winery's demand weakened.

== Administrative divisions ==
As of 2012, this county is divided to 6 towns, 10 townships and 2 ethnic townships.

Towns

- Chengguan (城关镇)
- Renhe (人和镇)
- Longtang (龙塘镇)
- Beiguan (北关镇)
- Chengzhuang (程庄镇)
- Wangzhuangzhai (王庄寨镇)

Townships

- Huayuan Township (花园乡)
- Yindian Township (尹店乡)
- Sunliu Township (孙六乡)
- Yegang Township (野岗乡)
- Shuangta Township (双塔乡)
- Linqi Township (林七乡)
- Chumiao Township (褚庙乡)
- Laoyanji Township (老颜集乡)
- Shunhe Township (顺河乡)
- Wangqiao Township (王桥乡)

Ethnic townships

- Bodang Hui Township (伯党回族乡)
- Huji Hui Township (胡集回族乡)

== Climate ==
Climate data for Minquan, elevation 62 m (203 ft), (1991–2020 normals, extremes 1981–2010)
Month	Jan	Feb	Mar	Apr	May	Jun	Jul	Aug	Sep	Oct	Nov	Dec	Year
Record high °C (°F)	17.3 (63.1)	24.9 (76.8)	27.8 (82.0)	32.9 (91.2)	38.5 (101.3)	40.1 (104.2)	39.7 (103.5)	38.1 (100.6)	35.3 (95.5)	34.3 (93.7)	27.3 (81.1)	20.2 (68.4)	40.1 (104.2)
Mean daily maximum °C (°F)	5.2 (41.4)	9.2 (48.6)	15.0 (59.0)	21.4 (70.5)	27.0 (80.6)	31.7 (89.1)	32.0 (89.6)	30.6 (87.1)	27.0 (80.6)	21.9 (71.4)	13.9 (57.0)	7.2 (45.0)	20.2 (68.3)
Daily mean °C (°F)	0.2 (32.4)	3.7 (38.7)	9.2 (48.6)	15.3 (59.5)	20.9 (69.6)	25.7 (78.3)	27.2 (81.0)	25.8 (78.4)	21.3 (70.3)	15.6 (60.1)	8.2 (46.8)	2.1 (35.8)	14.6 (58.3)
Mean daily minimum °C (°F)	−3.5 (25.7)	−0.7 (30.7)	4.2 (39.6)	9.7 (49.5)	15.2 (59.4)	20.3 (68.5)	23.2 (73.8)	22.2 (72.0)	16.9 (62.4)	10.7 (51.3)	3.8 (38.8)	−1.7 (28.9)	10.0 (50.0)
Record low °C (°F)	−17.7 (0.1)	−18.5 (−1.3)	−11.0 (12.2)	−3.7 (25.3)	3.8 (38.8)	10.4 (50.7)	15.8 (60.4)	11.5 (52.7)	6.3 (43.3)	−2.2 (28.0)	−13.1 (8.4)	−16.5 (2.3)	−18.5 (−1.3)
Average precipitation mm (inches)	11.6 (0.46)	15.5 (0.61)	20.6 (0.81)	38.6 (1.52)	59.5 (2.34)	76.2 (3.00)	163.5 (6.44)	153.0 (6.02)	76.9 (3.03)	35.7 (1.41)	29.8 (1.17)	11.0 (0.43)	691.9 (27.24)
Average precipitation days (≥ 0.1 mm)	4.0	4.3	4.7	5.5	6.4	6.9	10.7	10.7	8.2	5.6	5.4	3.8	76.2
Average snowy days	3.3	2.6	1.0	0.2	0	0	0	0	0	0	0.9	2.0	10
Average relative humidity (%)	66	63	62	66	68	67	80	84	78	71	70	67	70
Mean monthly sunshine hours	128.4	139.6	182.6	205.8	222.0	206.6	182.3	176.0	165.3	162.8	144.4	135.7	2,051.5
Percentage possible sunshine	41	45	49	52	51	48	42	43	45	47	47	45	46
Source: China Meteorological Administration

== Notable persons ==
- Xu Zhiyong
- Dai Xu
