= Tongxu County =

Tongxu County 通许县 Tungsu
- County
- Location of the seat in Henan
- Coordinates: 34.480°N 114.467°E
- Country: People's Republic of China
- Province: Henan
- Prefecture-level city: Kaifeng

Area
  - Total: 767 km^{2} (296 sq mi)

Population (2019)
  - Total: 518,400
  - Density: 676/km^{2} (1,750/sq mi)
- Time zone: UTC+8 (China Standard)
- Postal code: 475400

Tongxu County (simplified Chinese: 通许县; traditional Chinese: 通許縣; pinyin: Tōngxǔ Xiàn) is a county in the east-central part of Henan province, China. It is under the administration of Kaifeng city.

== Administrative divisions ==
As of 2012, this county is divided to 6 towns and 6 townships.

Towns

- Changzhi (长智镇)
- Chengguan (城关镇)
- Shugang (竖岗镇)
- Sisuolou (四所楼镇)
- Yuhuangmiao (玉皇庙镇)
- Zhusha (朱砂镇)

Townships

- Dagangli Township (大岗李乡)
- Dige Township (邸阁乡)
- Fengzhuang Township (冯庄乡)
- Liancheng Township (练城乡)
- Lizhuang Township (厉庄乡)
- Sunying Township (孙营乡)

== Climate ==
Climate data for Tongxu, elevation 64 m (210 ft), (1991–2020 normals, extremes 1981–2010)
Month	Jan	Feb	Mar	Apr	May	Jun	Jul	Aug	Sep	Oct	Nov	Dec	Year
Record high °C (°F)	18.0 (64.4)	22.9 (73.2)	28.2 (82.8)	32.8 (91.0)	38.4 (101.1)	39.5 (103.1)	38.8 (101.8)	37.1 (98.8)	36.8 (98.2)	34.7 (94.5)	27.1 (80.8)	20.7 (69.3)	39.5 (103.1)
Mean daily maximum °C (°F)	5.4 (41.7)	9.4 (48.9)	15.2 (59.4)	21.6 (70.9)	27.1 (80.8)	31.8 (89.2)	32.0 (89.6)	30.6 (87.1)	27.0 (80.6)	21.7 (71.1)	14.0 (57.2)	7.4 (45.3)	20.3 (68.5)
Daily mean °C (°F)	0.7 (33.3)	4.1 (39.4)	9.6 (49.3)	15.8 (60.4)	21.4 (70.5)	26.1 (79.0)	27.4 (81.3)	26.0 (78.8)	21.6 (70.9)	16.0 (60.8)	8.8 (47.8)	2.7 (36.9)	15.0 (59.0)
Mean daily minimum °C (°F)	−2.9 (26.8)	0.1 (32.2)	5.0 (41.0)	10.7 (51.3)	16.2 (61.2)	21.1 (70.0)	23.7 (74.7)	22.4 (72.3)	17.4 (63.3)	11.5 (52.7)	4.7 (40.5)	−0.9 (30.4)	10.8 (51.4)
Record low °C (°F)	−16.5 (2.3)	−13.1 (8.4)	−12.1 (10.2)	−0.8 (30.6)	2.8 (37.0)	11.7 (53.1)	16.6 (61.9)	12.9 (55.2)	6.7 (44.1)	−0.8 (30.6)	−9.0 (15.8)	−12.8 (9.0)	−16.5 (2.3)
Average precipitation mm (inches)	10.1 (0.40)	14.3 (0.56)	21.9 (0.86)	39.4 (1.55)	57.5 (2.26)	73.4 (2.89)	145.5 (5.73)	131.5 (5.18)	68.5 (2.70)	41.2 (1.62)	29.3 (1.15)	11.1 (0.44)	643.7 (25.34)
Average precipitation days (≥ 0.1 mm)	3.8	4.1	5.0	5.5	7.3	7.5	10.8	9.8	8.3	6.0	5.0	3.4	76.5
Average snowy days	3.6	3.0	1.2	0.2	0	0	0	0	0	0	0.9	2.3	11.2
Average relative humidity (%)	64	63	62	66	67	66	80	83	77	70	69	66	69
Mean monthly sunshine hours	112.6	128.9	172.3	201.1	212.1	193.2	176.5	167.0	156.4	151.0	125.9	114.2	1,911.2
Percentage possible sunshine	36	41	46	51	49	45	40	41	42	44	41	37	43
Source: China Meteorological Administration
