= Liangyuan, Shangqiu =

Liangyuan 梁园区
- County
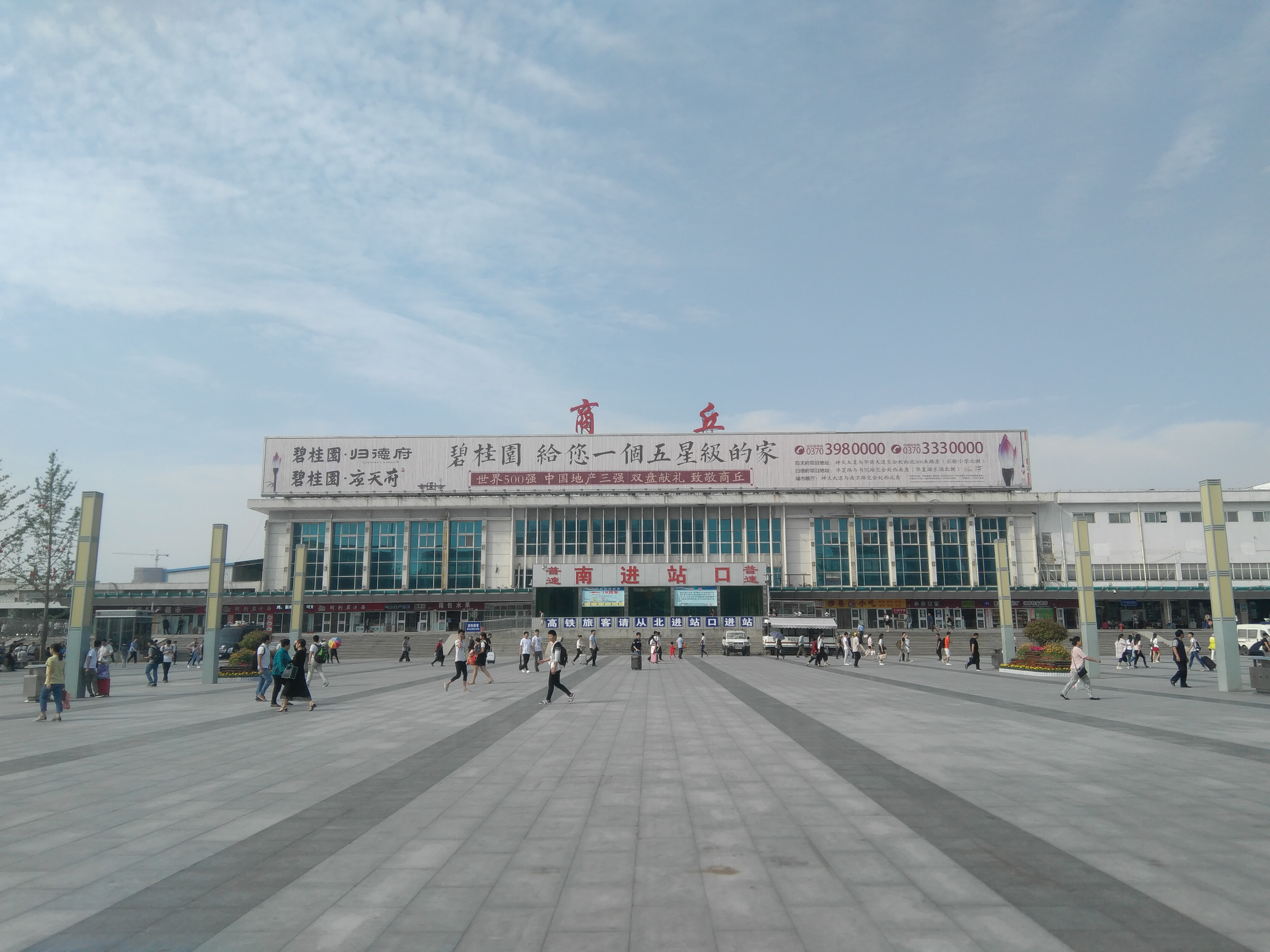
- Shangqiu railway station

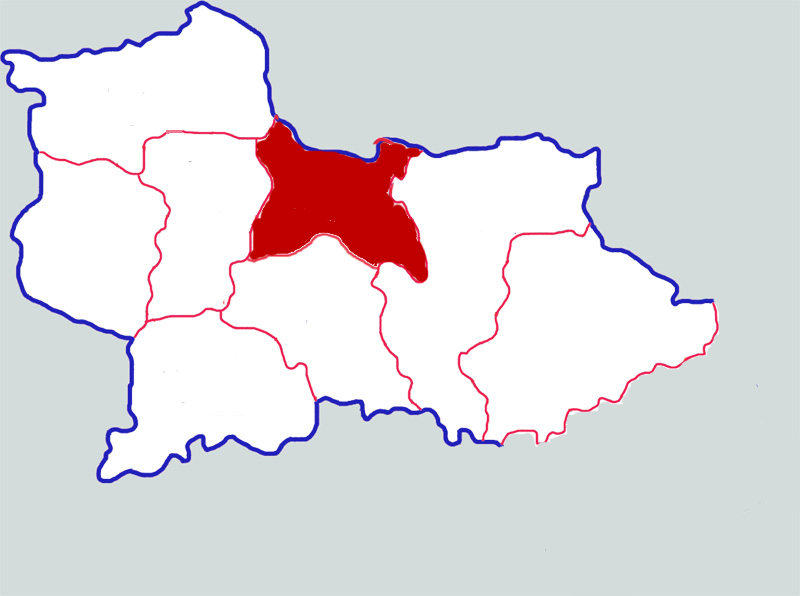
- Location in Shangqiu

- Location in Henan
- Coordinates: 34°26′38″N 115°36′50″E
- Country: People's Republic of China
- Province: Henan
- Prefecture-level city: Shangqiu

Area
  - Total: 673 km^{2} (260 sq mi)

Population (2019)
  - Total: 967,400
  - Density: 1,440/km^{2} (3,720/sq mi)
- Time zone: UTC+8 (China Standard)
- Postal code: 476000

Liangyuan District (simplified Chinese: 梁园区; traditional Chinese: 梁園區; pinyin: Liángyuán Qū) is one of the two districts of the city of Shangqiu, Henan province. The name Liangyuan, or "the garden of Liang", follows from the name Prince Xiao of Liang, who built the garden around 154 BC centered in the area of nowadays Shangqiu. At present, Liangyuan district hosts the government of Shangqiu city.

== Administrative divisions ==
As of 2012, this district is divided to 10 subdistricts, 3 towns and 7 townships.

Subdistricts

- Qianjin Subdistrict (前进街道)
- Changzheng Subdistrict (长征街道)
- Baba Subdistrict (八八街道)
- Dongfeng Subdistrict (东风街道)
- Zhongzhou Subdistrict (中州街道)
- Baiyun Subdistrict (白云街道)
- Pingyuan Subdistrict (平原街道)
- Jianshe Subdistrict (建设街道)
- Pingtai Subdistrict (平台街道)
- Ping'an Subdistrict (平安街道)

Towns

- Xieji (谢集镇)
- Shuangba (双八镇)
- Zhangge (张阁镇)

Townships

- Zhouji Township (周集乡)
- Shuichipu Township (水池铺乡)
- Guantang Township (观堂乡)
- Wanglou Township (王楼乡)
- Lizhuang Township (李庄乡)
- Sunfuji Township (孙福集乡)
- Liukou Township (刘口乡)
