= Ningling County =

Ningling County 宁陵县
- County
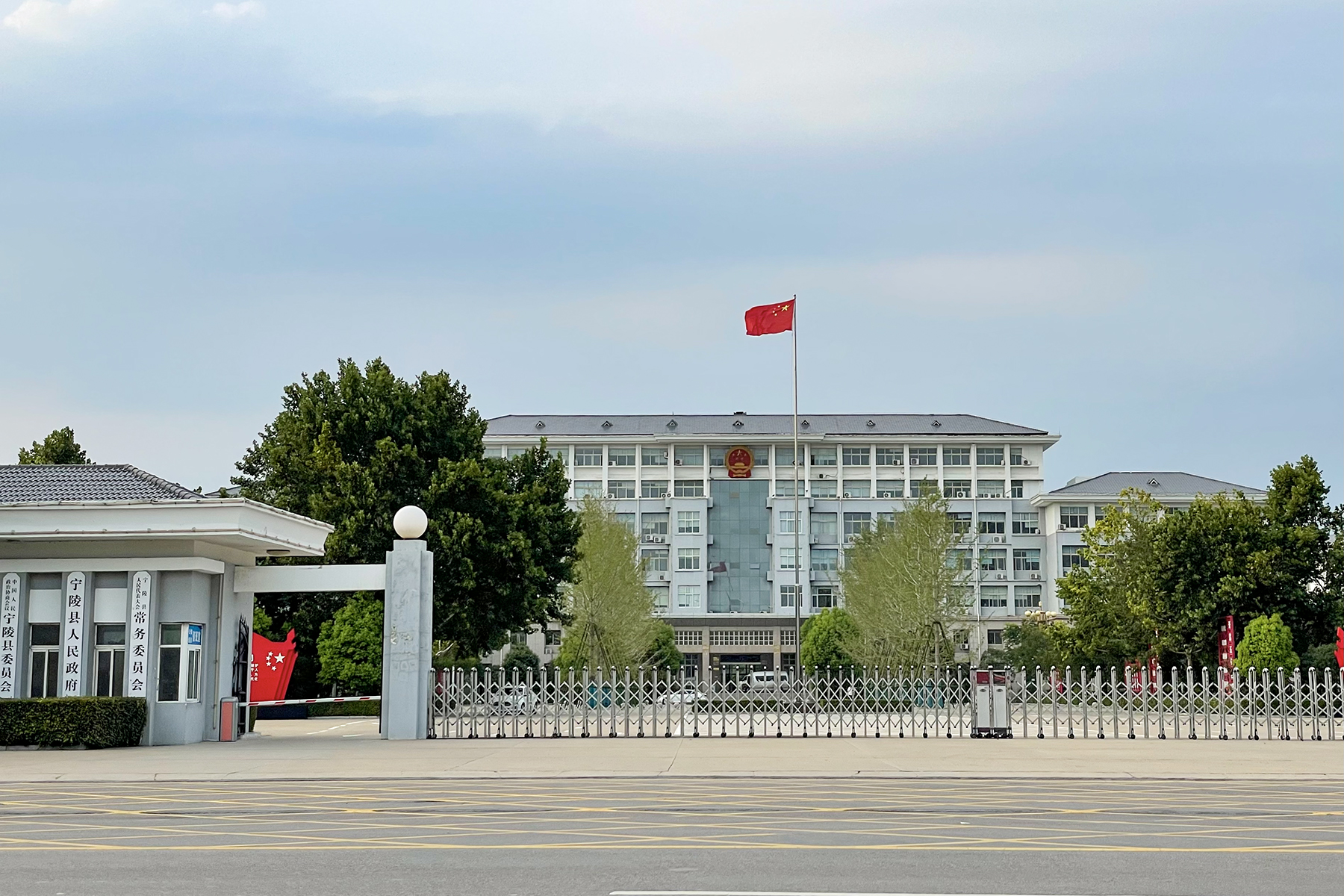
- People's Government of Ningling County Building in 2022

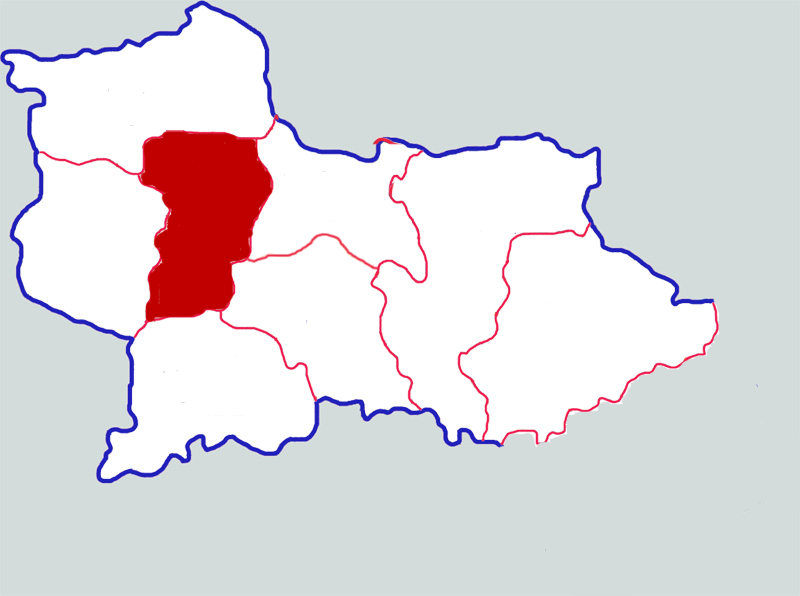
- Location in Shangqiu

- Location of the seat in Henan
- Coordinates: 34°27′40″N 115°18′50″E
- Country: People's Republic of China
- Province: Henan
- Prefecture-level city: Shangqiu

Area
  - Total: 786 km^{2} (303 sq mi)

Population (2019)
  - Total: 508,800
  - Density: 647/km^{2} (1,680/sq mi)
- Time zone: UTC+8 (China Standard)
- Postal code: 476700

Ningling County (simplified Chinese: 宁陵县; traditional Chinese: 寧陵縣; pinyin: Nínglíng Xiàn) is a county under the prefecture-level city of Shangqiu, in the east of Henan province, People's Republic of China.

== Administrative divisions ==
As of 2012, this county is divided to 5 towns and 9 townships.

Towns

- Chengguan (城关镇)
- Zhanggong (张弓镇)
- Liuhe (柳河镇)
- Luogang (逻岗镇)
- Shiqiao (石桥镇)

Townships

- Huanggang Township (黄岗乡)
- Huabao Township (华堡乡)
- Liulou Township (刘楼乡)
- Chenglou Township (程楼乡)
- Qiaolou Township (乔楼乡)
- Chengjiao Township (城郊乡)
- Yangyi Township (阳驿乡)
- Kongji Township (孔集乡)
- Zhaocun Township (赵村乡)

== Climate ==
Climate data for Ningling, elevation 56 m (184 ft), (1991–2020 normals, extremes 1981–2010)
Month	Jan	Feb	Mar	Apr	May	Jun	Jul	Aug	Sep	Oct	Nov	Dec	Year
Record high °C (°F)	17.8 (64.0)	25.4 (77.7)	27.3 (81.1)	32.7 (90.9)	37.8 (100.0)	39.5 (103.1)	38.6 (101.5)	37.6 (99.7)	37.9 (100.2)	34.9 (94.8)	28.3 (82.9)	20.5 (68.9)	39.5 (103.1)
Mean daily maximum °C (°F)	5.5 (41.9)	9.4 (48.9)	15.0 (59.0)	21.3 (70.3)	26.8 (80.2)	31.6 (88.9)	32.1 (89.8)	30.7 (87.3)	27.2 (81.0)	22.0 (71.6)	14.1 (57.4)	7.5 (45.5)	20.3 (68.5)
Daily mean °C (°F)	0.2 (32.4)	3.6 (38.5)	9.2 (48.6)	15.3 (59.5)	20.7 (69.3)	25.5 (77.9)	27.2 (81.0)	25.8 (78.4)	21.3 (70.3)	15.4 (59.7)	8.1 (46.6)	2.1 (35.8)	14.5 (58.2)
Mean daily minimum °C (°F)	−3.6 (25.5)	−0.7 (30.7)	4.2 (39.6)	9.8 (49.6)	15.2 (59.4)	20.2 (68.4)	23.4 (74.1)	22.1 (71.8)	16.8 (62.2)	10.5 (50.9)	3.7 (38.7)	−1.7 (28.9)	10.0 (50.0)
Record low °C (°F)	−15.2 (4.6)	−15.4 (4.3)	−7.2 (19.0)	−3.5 (25.7)	4.0 (39.2)	11.4 (52.5)	16.2 (61.2)	11.6 (52.9)	5.5 (41.9)	−1.6 (29.1)	−13.7 (7.3)	−13.3 (8.1)	−15.4 (4.3)
Average precipitation mm (inches)	13.7 (0.54)	17.4 (0.69)	27.3 (1.07)	42.4 (1.67)	61.7 (2.43)	78.8 (3.10)	157.4 (6.20)	159.6 (6.28)	77.3 (3.04)	41.3 (1.63)	33.0 (1.30)	12.6 (0.50)	722.5 (28.45)
Average precipitation days (≥ 0.1 mm)	4.3	4.7	5.3	5.9	7.0	7.9	11.3	10.7	8.2	5.9	5.5	3.9	80.6
Average snowy days	3.7	2.8	1.0	0.1	0	0	0	0	0	0	0.9	2.1	10.6
Average relative humidity (%)	67	65	64	68	70	68	81	85	80	74	73	69	72
Mean monthly sunshine hours	116.4	129.8	166.2	197.1	211.4	197.5	180.8	172.3	154.6	151.6	135.6	122.9	1,936.2
Percentage possible sunshine	37	42	45	50	49	46	41	42	42	44	44	40	44
Source: China Meteorological Administration
