= Shangqiu =

Shangqiu 商丘市 Shangkiu
- Prefecture-level city
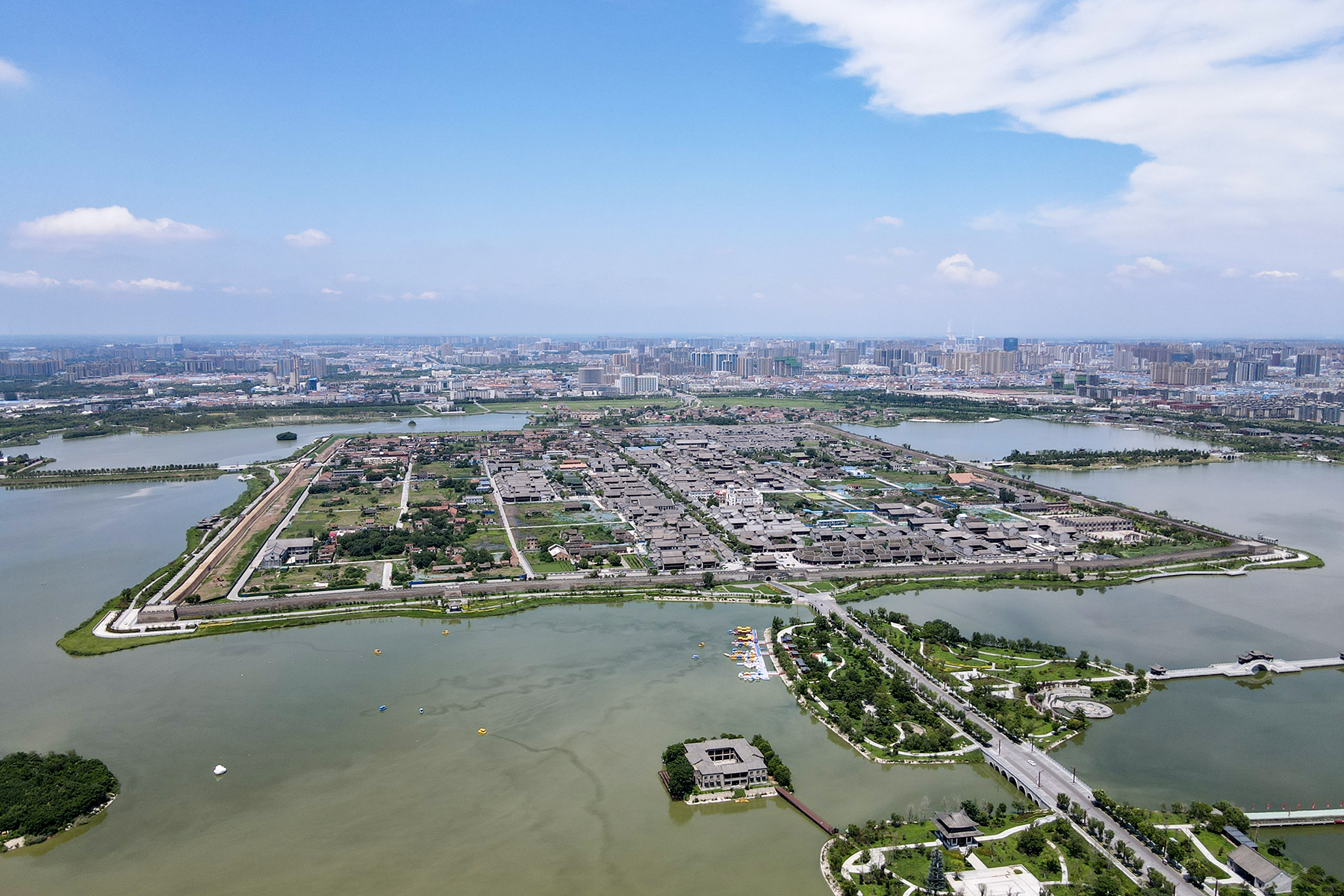
- Aerial view of Shangqiu old city

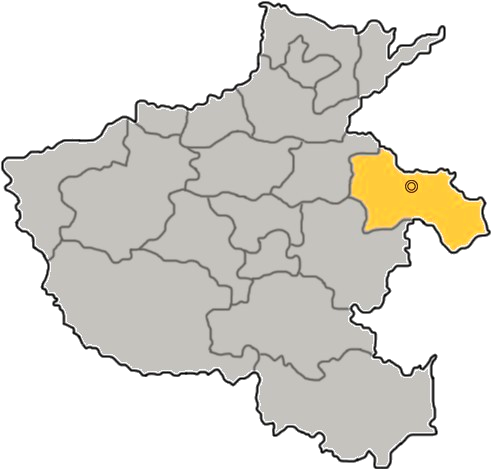
- Shangqiu Prefecture in Henan

- Location on the North China Plain Shangqiu (China)
- Coordinates (Shangqiu municipal government): 34°24′54″N 115°39′22″E
- Country: People's Republic of China
- Province: Henan
- Municipal seat: Suiyang District

Area
  - Prefecture-level city: 10,658 km^{2} (4,115 sq mi)
  - Urban: 1,697 km^{2} (655 sq mi)
  - Metro: 3,255 km^{2} (1,257 sq mi)
- Elevation: 50 m (160 ft)

Population (2020 census)
  - Prefecture-level city: 7,816,831
  - Density: 733.42/km^{2} (1,899.6/sq mi)
  - Urban: 1,859,723
  - Urban density: 1,096/km^{2} (2,838/sq mi)
  - Metro: 2,831,814
  - Metro density: 870.0/km^{2} (2,253/sq mi)

GDP
  - Prefecture-level city: CN¥ 198.9 billion US$ 29.9 billion
  - Per capita: CN¥ 27,332; US$ 4,115
- Time zone: UTC+8 (China Standard)
- Postal Code: 476000
- Area code: 370
- ISO 3166 code: CN-HA-14
- Major Nationalities: Han
- County-level divisions: 9
- Township-level divisions: 116
- License plate prefixes: 豫N
- Website: shangqiu.gov.cn

Shangqiu
- Chinese: 商丘
Transcriptions
Standard Mandarin
- Hanyu Pinyin: Shāngqiū
- Wade–Giles: Shang^{1}-chʻiu^{1}
- IPA: [ʂáŋtɕʰjóʊ]
Yue: Cantonese
- Jyutping: Soeng^{1}-jau^{1}
Southern Min
- Tâi-lô: Siong-khu

Alternative Chinese name
- Chinese: 商邱
Transcriptions

Shangqiu (Chinese: 商丘), alternately romanized as Shangkiu, is a city in eastern Henan province, Central China. It borders Kaifeng to the northwest, Zhoukou to the southwest, and the provinces of Shandong and Anhui to the northeast and southeast respectively. Its population was 7,816,831 inhabitants as of the 2020 Chinese census, of whom 2,831,814 lived in the built-up (or metro) area made up of two urban districts (Liangyuan and Suiyang) and Yucheng county now being conurbated.

Shangqiu and surrounding area was an important base for the Shang dynasty (c. 1600 – c. 1046 BC), and the city itself was established more than three millennia ago. Shangqiu has grown significantly in recent years. It is located at an important location at the junction of several major railways, making it a major regional transportation hub.

== History ==
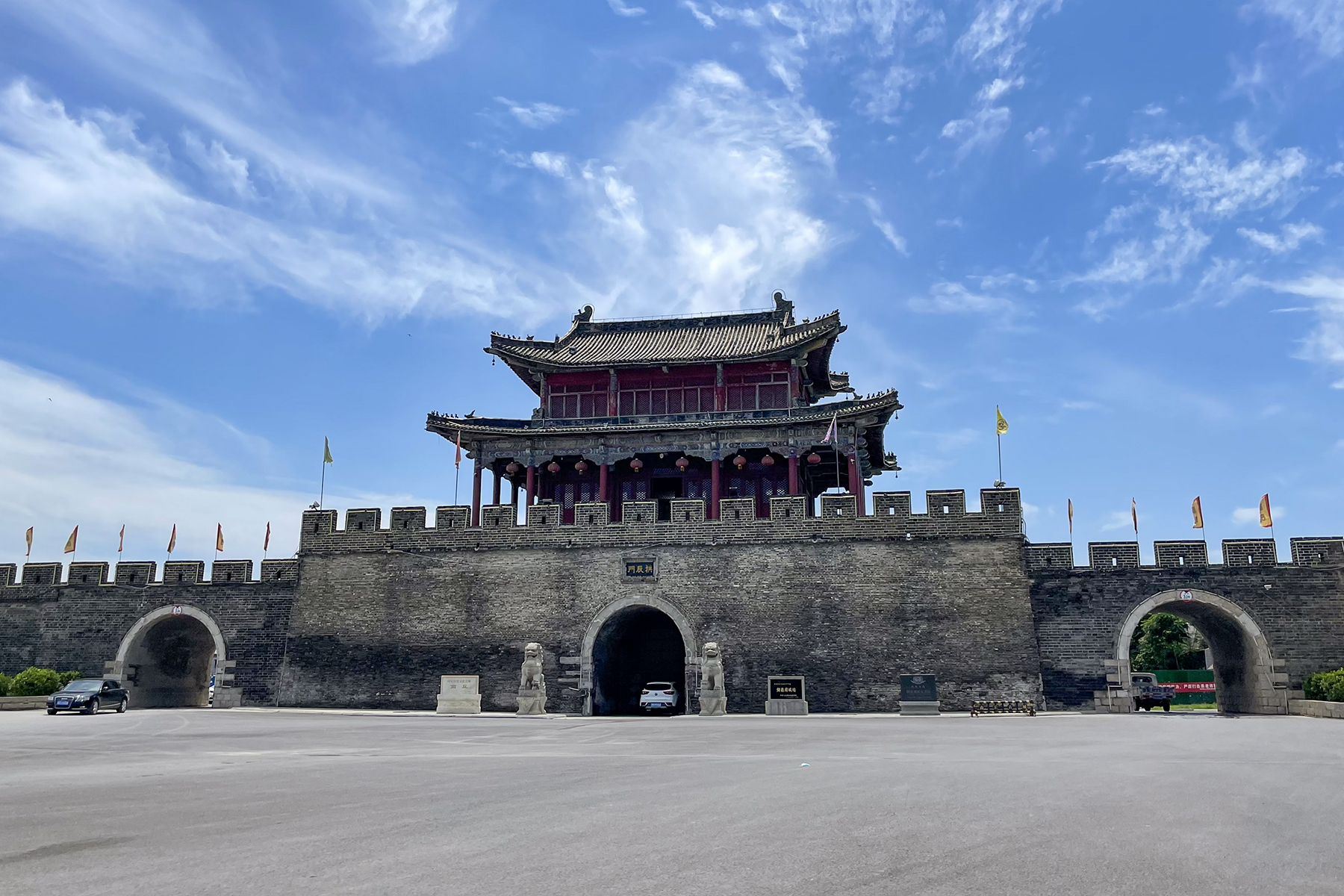
Gongchen Gate, part of the Shangqiu city walls

The history of Shangqiu ("Hills of Shang") is closely related to the very beginning of Chinese history. The tradition dates back to the legendary Three Sovereigns and Five Emperors periods (c. 25th century BC), when the legendary Emperors Shennong, Zhuanxu and Ku were said to be living in the present Shangqiu area. The son of Emperor Ku, Xie, who helped Yu the Great to control the floods of his day, was enfeoffed the area of Shang, who also became the ancestor of the Predynastic Shang. Shangqiu was also reportedly one of the capitals defended by the Xia emperor Xiang, troubled by rebellions in his reign. The thirteenth generation grandson of Xie (契), Tang overthrew the ruling Xia dynasty and founded the Shang dynasty, with its first capital at Nanbo (南亳, currently south of Shangqiu). Around the 11th century BC, the Shang dynasty was replaced by the Zhou dynasty. The royal descendants of the Shang dynasty were enfeoffed the area of Shangqiu, which later became the state of Song.

The Song capital, known as Suiyang, was located at present-day Nanguan (南关) in the south of Shangqiu's urban area. The Song was a major power during the Spring and Autumn era, but declined during the Warring States era and eventually fell to the Qi and Wei in 286 BC. In the Han dynasty, Suiyang served as the capital of the Liang Kingdom. King Xiao of Liang (r. 169 BC – 144 BC) stayed loyal to the Emperor Jing of Han in the Rebellion of the Seven States, during which a failed siege of Suiyang caused the collapse of the main rebel army. The king was also a famous patron of arts and literature who hosted some of the best known Han poets, such as Zhuang Ji and Sima Xiangru, in the Liang capital.

From the Cao Wei dynasty to the early Sui dynasty, Suiyang was the seat of Liang Commandery (梁郡). It became the seat of Song Prefecture (Songzhou) in 596 AD. During the An Lushan rebellion in the Tang dynasty, a ten-month-long siege of Suiyang in 757 turned the tide of the war to the Tang's favor.

Before he ascended to the imperial throne as the Emperor Taizu of Song, Zhao Kuangyin was the jiedushi (military governor) of Guidejun (歸德軍), a region centered in Songzhou. Thus, he chose "Song" as the name of the new dynasty he founded in 960. The city was the southern capital of the Northern Song dynasty under the name Nanjing. Shangqiu was the first in a series of temporary capitals that the Song dynasty government moved to during their retreat from the north, when most of northern China had been conquered by the Jurchens in the Jin–Song wars. The Song court had retreated south to the city from their original capital in Kaifeng, after it was captured by the Jurchens in the Jingkang Incident of 1127. The court moved to Shangqiu because of its historical importance to Emperor Taizu. The symbolism of the city was meant to secure the political legitimacy of the new Emperor Gaozong, who was crowned emperor of China in Shangqiu on June 12, 1127. The capital was again moved in 1128 to Yangzhou, and finally to Hangzhou in 1129. In the Yuan, Ming and Qing dynasties, Shangqiu was governed as Guide Prefecture (歸德府). The current name appeared in 1545, when a new Shangqiu County was created to administer the city and its surrounding areas.

Under the Republic, Shangqiu was considered a key city in eastern Henan owing to its position along the Lunghai Railway between the port of Haizhou on the East China Sea and Lanzhou in central China. It was known at the time as Kweiteh, Kwei-teh, or Kuei-te (歸德; Guīdé) and had both a Catholic diocese and an Anglican mission, the later of which ran St Paul's Hospital. It changed hands frequently during the fighting among the Chinese warlords in 1927. Following the Manchurian Incident, Gui'de (Kwei-teh) Airbase was established, and became an auxiliary/forward airbase of the Nationalist Air Force of China during the War of Resistance-World War II (1937–1945), and supported aerial-attack missions against Imperial Japanese positions in the northern-front of the war; the 4th Fighter-Attack Group of the Chinese Air Force flew from Gui'de Airbase in March–April 1938 in support of Chinese ground forces at the Battle of Taierzhuang. Gui'de Airbase is now known as Shangqiu Airport.

== Geography and climate ==
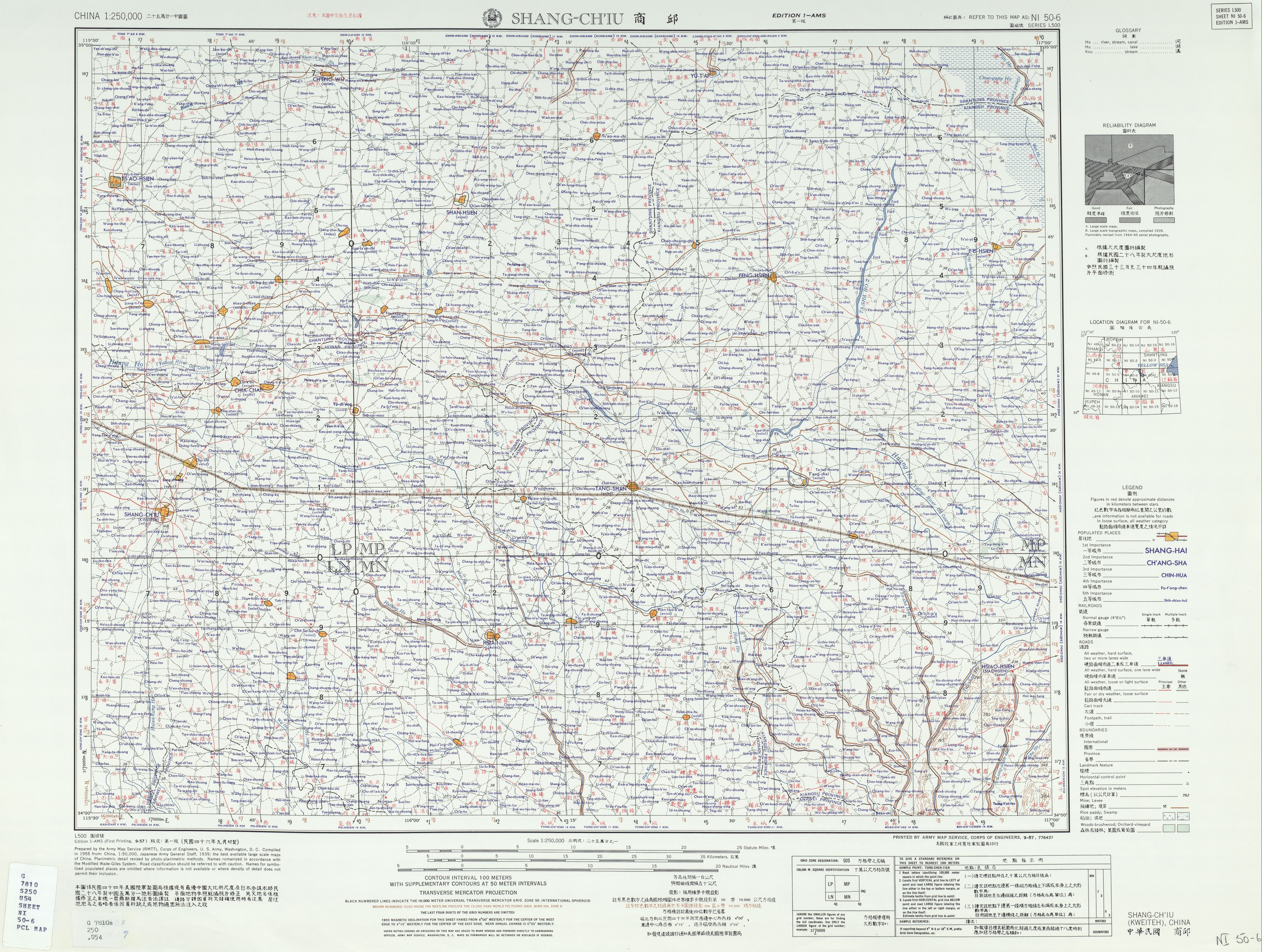
Map including Shangqiu (labeled as SHANG-CH'IU (KWEITEH) (walled) 商邱) (AMS, 1955)

Shangqiu is the easternmost prefecture of Henan province. Its administrative area ranges in longitude from 114 °49′ E to 116° 39′ E and in latitude from 33° 43′ N to 34° 52′ N, covering 10,704 square kilometres (4,133 sq mi). The city lies on the North China Plain and is mostly flat, with elevations ranging from 30 to 70 metres (98 to 230 ft), though the northwest part of the prefecture is more elevated than the southeast.

Shangqiu has a monsoon-influenced humid subtropical climate (Köppen Cwa), with four distinct seasons. Winters are cool and mostly dry while summers are hot and humid; spring is warm and sees some, but not much rainfall, while autumn weather is crisp and drier. The monthly 24-hour average temperature ranges from around the freezing mark in January to 27.0 °C (80.6 °F) in July, while the annual mean is 14.4 °C (57.9 °F). Close to two-thirds of the annual precipitation occurs from June to September. The average temperature is below 10 °C for winter, 22 °C for summer, and between 10 and 22 °C for spring and autumn. Shangqiu City has a long winter, followed by summer, and a significantly shorter spring and autumn.

The average annual precipitation in the urban area of Shangqiu City has been 711.9 mm, and the corresponding total precipitation is 59.13 million cubic meters. The average annual runoff depth is 76.8 mm and the total runoff is 6.405 million cubic meters.

Climate data for Shangqiu, elevation 51 m (167 ft), (1991–2020 normals, extremes 1971–2010)
Month	Jan	Feb	Mar	Apr	May	Jun	Jul	Aug	Sep	Oct	Nov	Dec	Year
Record high °C (°F)	18.2 (64.8)	25.9 (78.6)	28.2 (82.8)	33.5 (92.3)	38.1 (100.6)	41.3 (106.3)	39.4 (102.9)	37.9 (100.2)	35.8 (96.4)	35.0 (95.0)	27.5 (81.5)	20.3 (68.5)	41.3 (106.3)
Mean daily maximum °C (°F)	5.4 (41.7)	9.2 (48.6)	15.0 (59.0)	21.4 (70.5)	26.7 (80.1)	31.5 (88.7)	32.0 (89.6)	30.6 (87.1)	27.0 (80.6)	21.9 (71.4)	14.0 (57.2)	7.5 (45.5)	20.2 (68.3)
Daily mean °C (°F)	0.2 (32.4)	3.6 (38.5)	9.1 (48.4)	15.4 (59.7)	20.9 (69.6)	25.6 (78.1)	27.3 (81.1)	25.9 (78.6)	21.3 (70.3)	15.5 (59.9)	8.3 (46.9)	2.1 (35.8)	14.6 (58.3)
Mean daily minimum °C (°F)	−3.5 (25.7)	−0.7 (30.7)	4.1 (39.4)	10.0 (50.0)	15.5 (59.9)	20.4 (68.7)	23.5 (74.3)	22.3 (72.1)	16.9 (62.4)	10.7 (51.3)	3.8 (38.8)	−1.7 (28.9)	10.1 (50.2)
Record low °C (°F)	−15.2 (4.6)	−15.4 (4.3)	−7.1 (19.2)	−2.0 (28.4)	4.2 (39.6)	11.9 (53.4)	15.7 (60.3)	12.7 (54.9)	5.8 (42.4)	−0.7 (30.7)	−12.3 (9.9)	−15.0 (5.0)	−15.4 (4.3)
Average precipitation mm (inches)	14.2 (0.56)	18.1 (0.71)	26.4 (1.04)	40.6 (1.60)	61.8 (2.43)	85.9 (3.38)	168.3 (6.63)	165.5 (6.52)	74.2 (2.92)	40.3 (1.59)	31.9 (1.26)	13.8 (0.54)	741 (29.18)
Average precipitation days (≥ 0.1 mm)	4.1	4.7	5.1	5.8	7.1	7.5	11.1	10.2	8.0	5.7	5.5	4.0	78.8
Average snowy days	3.6	3.0	1.1	0	0	0	0	0	0	0	0.8	2.1	10.6
Average relative humidity (%)	67	66	64	67	69	68	80	84	79	73	72	69	72
Mean monthly sunshine hours	118.5	127.0	167.9	192.4	206.7	179.4	165.3	157.5	155.7	153.9	137.0	122.8	1,884.1
Percentage possible sunshine	38	41	45	49	48	41	38	38	42	44	44	40	42
Source 1: China Meteorological Administration
Source 2: Weather China

== Government ==
The government of Shangqiu is responsible for the making and implementing of local policies. Since agriculture is still a major part of the economy of Shangqiu, many of the work is related to farmers and the development of the rural area. It is also observed that the government is exerting more and more efforts to attract foreign investment to spur local development. The current mayor is Tao Minglun.

== Demographics ==
According to the 2010 census, Shangqiu has a population of 7,362,472. That is 390,528 inhabitants less than in 2000 (the population shrank 5.04% in ten years).

=== Administration ===
The prefecture-level city of Shangqiu administers 2 districts, 1 county-level city and 6 counties. The information here presented uses the metric system and data from 2010 National Population Census.

Map
English name	Simplified Chinese	Hanyu Pinyin	Area (km^{2})	Population (2010)	Density (/km^{2})
Liangyuan District	梁园区	Liángyuán Qū	673	787,931	1,171
Suiyang District	睢阳区	Suīyáng Qū	913	748,356	820
Yongcheng City	永城市	Yǒngchéng Shì	2,068	1,240,296	600
Minquan County	民权县	Mínquán Xiàn	1,222	703,379	576
Sui County	睢县	Suī Xiàn	920	711,088	773
Ningling County	宁陵县	Nínglíng Xiàn	786	523,367	666
Zhecheng County	柘城县	Zhèchéng Xiàn	1,048	778,107	742
Yucheng County	虞城县	Yúchéng Xiàn	1,558	954,720	613
Xiayi County	夏邑县	Xiàyì Xiàn	1,470	915,228	623

== Religion ==
Shangqiu is traditionally a centre of the indigenous Chinese religious cult of Huoshen (火神 "Fire God"). An ancient small Temple of the Fire God has been expanded throughout the 2010s to become possibly the biggest temple complex dedicated to the god in China. Moreover, Shangqiu traditionally hosted the headquarters of Liguaism (Li Symbol transmission), the most important denomination of Baguadao.

== Economy ==
In 2019, Shangqiu's GDP reached 291.12 billion yuan, an increase of 7.4% over 2018. In 2019, the proportion of the tertiary industry structure was 14.7:41.0:44.3. In 2019, the city's general public budget revenue was 17.171 billion yuan, an increase of 11.7% over 2018.

=== Agriculture ===
Situated on the North China Plain, Shangqiu is part of a traditionally agricultural region. The fertile soil and convenient irrigation facilities greatly help the production of crops and other plants. As of 2005, there are about 719,864 hectares planted. The most important agricultural products are wheat, maize, cotton, sesame, vegetables, fruit, tobacco, and livestock. In 2002, it produced about 4.5 million tons of crops, 200 thousand tons of cotton, 1.1 million tons of fruits, and 550 thousand tons of livestock.

=== Industry ===
Compared with the agriculture, the industry of Shangqiu is relatively less developed. However, since the 1990s, it has experienced rapid growth. The food producing and packing company, Kedi group, has already been the number one exporter of frozen vegetables in the country. The large reserves of coal in Shangqiu (the Yongcheng-Xiayi coal mine is estimated to have a total of 10 billion tons in reserves) also boosts up the energy industry, such as electricity generation and aluminium electrolysis.

== Transportation ==
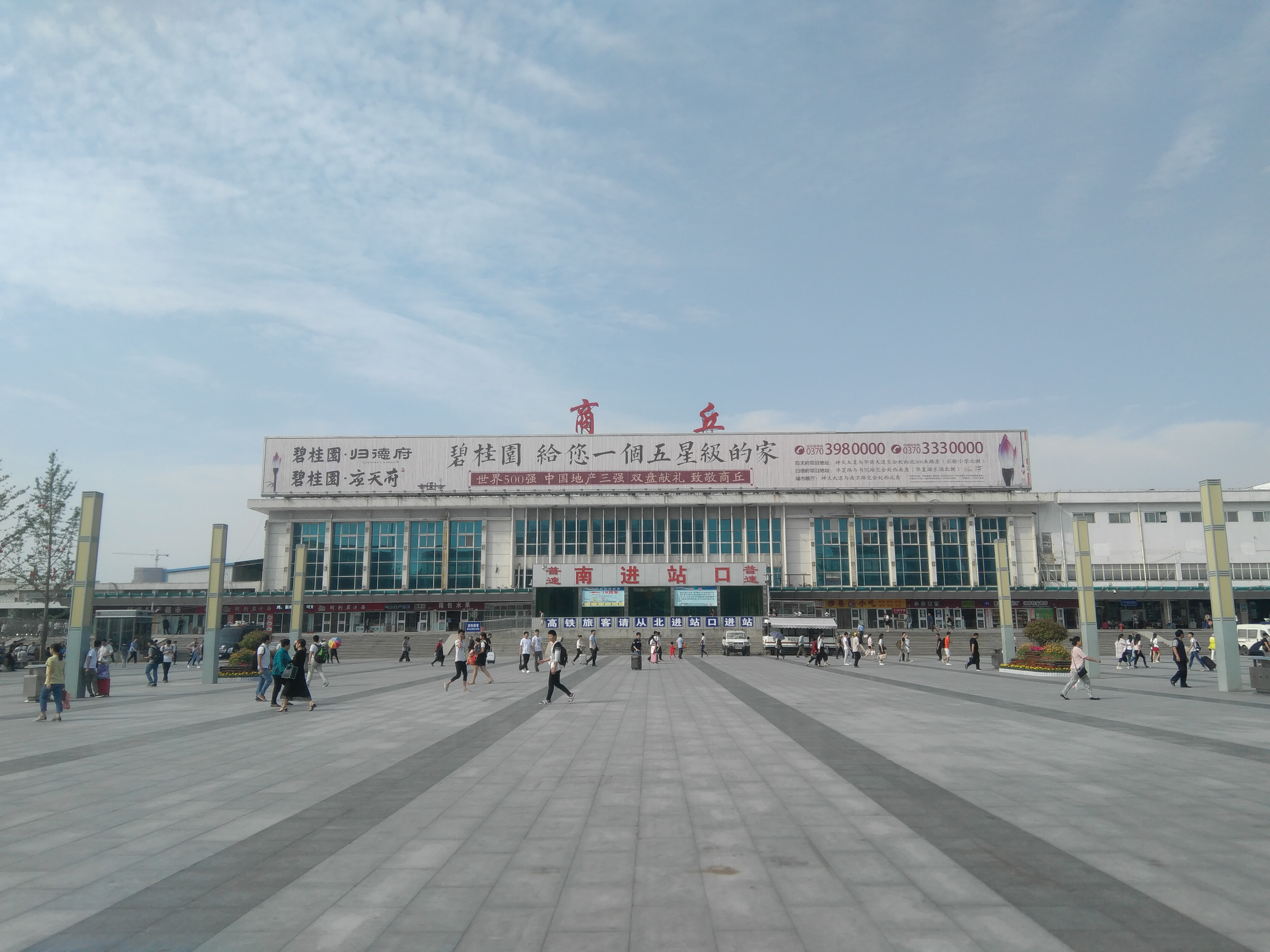
Shangqiu train station

Since the completion of east–west running Longhai railway in 1916, Shangqiu has been a local transportation center. This standing is greatly enhanced following the construction of the Beijing-Kowloon railway in 1996, which crosses with Longhai railway at Shangqiu. Nowadays, Longhai railway has become the Chinese segment of the larger "European-Asia continental landbridge," which runs from the sea port city Lianyungang to Rotterdam, the Netherlands. Shangqiu thus obtains the name of the city of the "golden cross". On the other hand, the road transport is also convenient and getting even better. The east–west direction Lianyungang-Khorghas (Xinjiang) national route 310 and north–south Beijing-Zhuhai national routh 105 also cross at Shangqiu. Highway traffic is fast-developing too. The Shangqiu-Kaifeng segment of the Lianyungang-Khorghas highway is already in use. Future planning for highway construction is also underway.

Shangqiu–Hangzhou high-speed railway began operation in June 2020.

== Education ==
The education sector of Shangqiu is mainly professional training oriented, with an increasing number of such colleges coming into sight ever since the 1990s.

=== Colleges and universities ===
- Shangqiu University (商丘学院)
- Shangqiu Normal University (商丘师范学院)
- Shangqiu Institute of Technology (商丘工学院)
- Shangqiu Professional Training College (商丘职业技术学院)
- Shangqiu Medical College (商丘医学高等专科学校)

== Society and culture ==
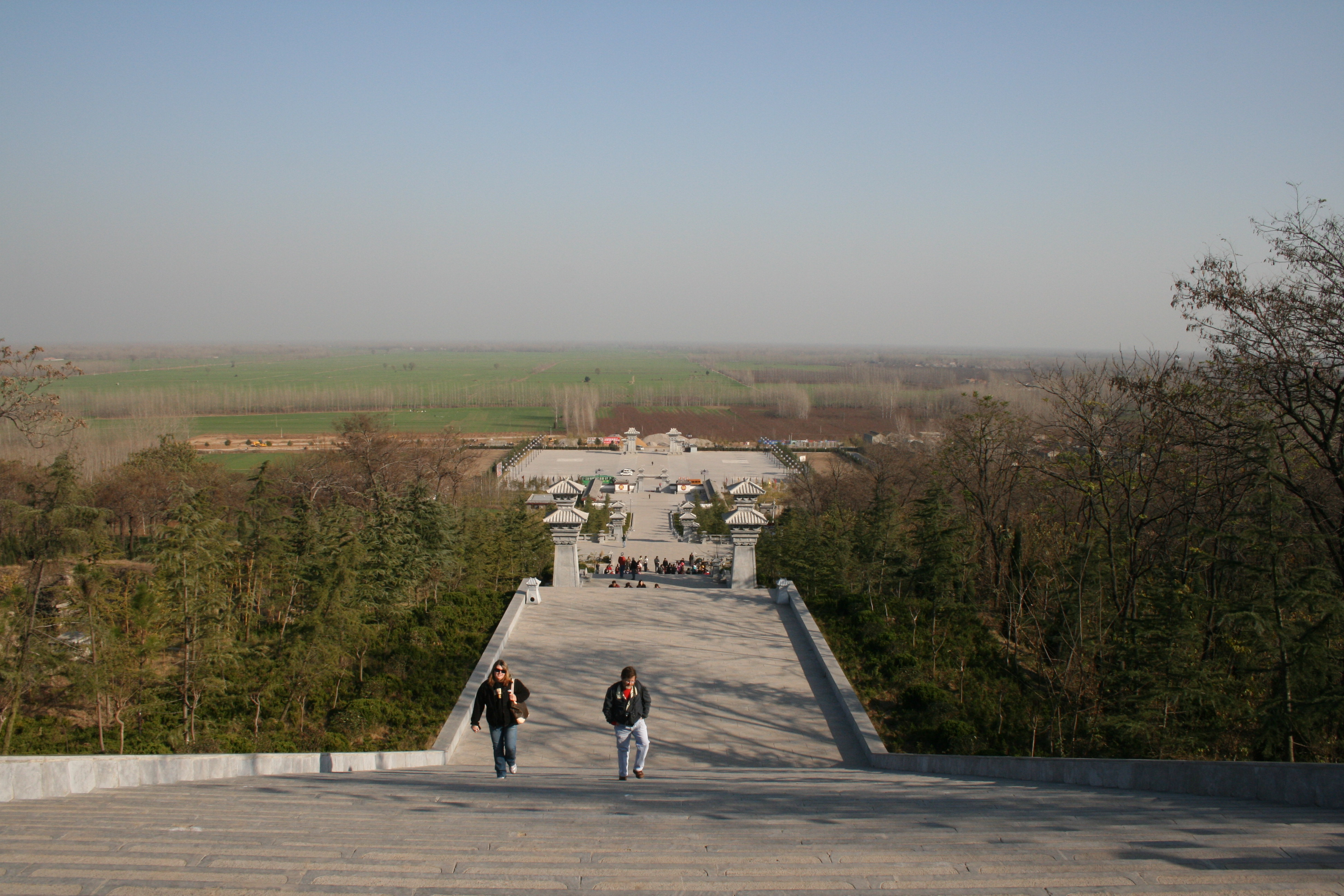
Tombs of Liang Kingdom (Western Han dynasty) at Mount Mangdang

Lying in the heart of the North China Plain, Shangqiu benefits from a deep cultural tradition. The first star observatory in China, Ebo Tai, was established in Shangqiu. Yingtian Shuyuan, one of the largest four official education agencies in north Song dynasty, is located in the Suiyang district of Shangqiu. The Suiyang old city, which was built in 1511 during the Ming dynasty, is one of the best preserved traditional cities in China, and was enlisted as one of the famous historical cities in China by the central government in 1986. The rich culture also raised many famous cultural figures. Cangjie, the legendary inventor of Chinese characters, was living in Shangqiu in the far-ancient periods. Zhuangzi, the great ancient philosopher of China, was born here around the 4th century BC. Another great philosopher, Mozi, living in the same period as Zhuangzi, was also a Shangqiu native.

=== Tourist attractions ===
- The ancient city of Suiyang (睢阳古城)
- Temple of Hua Mulan
- Former residence of Zhuangzi (庄周故里)
- Ebo Tai, the first star observatory of China (阏伯台)
- Mangdang Mountain tourism site (芒砀山文物旅游区)
- Shangqiu Ancient Culture Tourist Area (商丘古文化旅游区)
- Huaihai Battle Chenguanzhuang Memorial Hall Scenic Spot (淮海战役陈官庄纪念馆景区)
- Beihu Scenic Area, Sui County (睢县北湖景区)
- Cangjie Tomb (仓颉墓)
- Sui Emperor's Mausoleum (燧皇陵)
- Zhuangzi Cultural Tourism Scenic Area (庄子文化旅游景区)

=== Famous people of Shangqiu ===
- Cangjie
- Zhuangzi
- Mozi
- Hua Mulan
- Jiang Yan
- Xu Zhiyong
- Wang Junguang
- Dai De
- Dai Sheng
- Xie of Shang
- Xiang Tu

== Miscellaneous ==
- Shangqiu is also a Roman Catholic diocese.
- According to the history, the ancestral ancestor of the merchants (xiè) was able to control the water, seal the business, and then migrate. Later generations said that the ruins of the merchants had lived in the "Shangqiu".
