= Ashina Chengqing =

8th-century Turkic general in Tang and Yan armies

- Born: Second Turkic Khaganate
- Died: After 762
- Relatives: Ashina Mingyi (son); Ashina Congli (relative)
- Military career
- Allegiance: Second Turkic Khaganate; Tang dynasty; Great Yan
- Rank: Chancellor
- Conflicts: An–Shi Rebellion

Ashina Chengqing (Chinese: 阿史那承慶, romanized: Āshǐnà Chéngqìng), also known by the alias Ashina Chengxiu (Chinese: 阿史那承休, romanized: Āshǐnà Chéngxiū), was a Turkic royal prince of the Ashina clan and a prominent general during the An Lushan rebellion. Originally a noble of the Second Turkic Khaganate, he surrendered to the Tang dynasty in 742 and subsequently became a core member of the rebel Great Yan regime established by An Lushan.

The discovery of the Epitaph of Ashina Mingyi (his son) in Luoyang in 2016 led to new academic evaluations of his lineage and the nature of his titles within the rebel state.

== Identity and ancestry ==
The epitaph of his son identifies the father as Ashina Chengxiu. Historians agree that "Chengxiu" is an alias for Ashina Chengqing, adopted to avoid a naming taboo involving the character Qing (慶). However, scholars differ on the specific motivation. Hu Yaofei argues that the name change was adopted generally to avoid the character Qing because it appeared in the personal names of An Lushan's children. Hayami Dai argues that the timing of the epitaph (August 757) suggests the change was specifically to avoid the taboo of An Qingxu (安慶緒), who had assassinated An Lushan and became Emperor in early 757. Under the rebel dynasty's laws, subjects could not share a character with the reigning Emperor.

According to the epitaph, Chengqing's great-grandfather was Xiejinshi (Chinese: 纈緊施, romanized: Xiéjǐnshī), a qaghan over his own tribe (Chinese: 本蕃可汗, romanized: Běnfán Kèhán, lit. 'Qaghan of the native tribe') and his grandfather was Huizhen (Chinese: 惠真, romanized: Huìzhēn), a "Tegin" (Prince). Hu Yaofei suggests that the ancestor "Xiejinshi" refers to Ilterish Qaghan, the founder of the Second Turkic Khaganate. Hayami Dai disputes this, noting that the title "Ashina Xiejinshi" appears in other steles referring to Qapaghan Qaghan such as Stele of Kang Ayiqu Dagan. Even though in that stele this title is Xieyishi (頡佚施) with a different pronunciation, Hayami argues that these characters are phonetic variants of the same Turkic title and proposes that Chengqing was a direct grandson of Qapaghan Qaghan, which aligns with historical records of Qapaghan's grandsons surrendering in 742.

== Career ==
=== Surrender and service under Tang (742–755) ===
In the first year of the Tianbao era (742), following the collapse of the Second Turkic Khaganate, Ashina Chengqing surrendered to the Tang dynasty. He was part of a mass surrender of Turkic nobility led by the General Kang Ayiqu Dagan (Chinese: 康阿義屈達干, romanized: Kāng Āyìqū Dágān), which included royal figures such as the grandsons of Qapaghan Qaghan. Upon entering the Tang, he traveled from Shuofang to the capital Chang'an, where he received honorary titles before being assigned to the You-Yan region (modern Hebei) to engage in border defense under the command of An Lushan.

By the 10th year of Tianbao (751), Chengqing had risen to prominence within the Fanyang army. The New Book of Tang records that An Lushan promoted him from the ranks to serve as a high-ranking general in his shogunate, alongside officers such as An Shouzhong (安守忠) and Li Guiren (李帰仁).

=== Role in the An–Shi Rebellion ===
Ashina Chengqing was a key figure in the planning of the An–Shi Rebellion. According to the History of An Lushan (Chinese: 安祿山史記, romanized: Ān Lùshān Shǐjì) and the Zizhi Tongjian, he was one of only nine core conspirators who participated in the secret plot to overthrow the Tang, a group that included An Qingxu, Yan Zhuang, and Gao Shang. In this capacity, Chengqing held the title of "Foreign General" (Chinese: 蕃將, romanized: Fānjiàng), indicating his role as the supervisor of the non-Chinese tribal troops (Fan) which formed the core of An Lushan's military power.

Following the outbreak of the rebellion in late 755, An Lushan established the Great Yan dynasty in 756. Chengqing was appointed as a Chancellor (Tong Zhongshu Menxia Pingzhangshi) and enfeoffed as the Prince of Yunzhong (Chinese: 雲中郡王, romanized: Yúnzhōng Jùnwáng). Militarily, he was regarded by the Tang court as one of the rebel's most dangerous commanders. The Tang strategist Li Bi listed him alongside Shi Siming as a "fierce general" of the Yan army. In the 11th month of 755, An Lushan dispatched Chengqing to attack Yingchuan Commandery (modern Yuzhou, Henan). According to the Old Book of Tang, Chengqing launched a ferocious assault day and night for fifteen days, eventually capturing the commandery.

After An Lushan was assassinated in early 757, Ashina Chengqing served his successor, An Qingxu. Following the Tang reconquest of Luoyang in late 757, Chengqing fled north to Hebei leading 30,000 retreating troops. At the rebel stronghold of Ye, An Qingxu reorganized his government and appointed Chengqing as the Prince of Xiancheng (Chinese: 獻誠王, romanized: Xiànchéng Wáng).

An Qingxu grew suspicious of the powerful general Shi Siming, who controlled Youzhou (Fanyang). He dispatched Ashina Chengqing and An Shouzhong with 5,000 elite cavalry to conscript Shi Siming's troops and secretly eliminate him. However, Shi Siming feigned loyalty and invited them to a banquet. According to the Zizhi Tongjian, once Chengqing and Shouzhong were inside, Shi Siming disarmed them, disbanded their troops, and took them prisoner. Rather than executing them, Shi Siming integrated them into his own command structure.

In 758, Shi Siming nominally surrendered to the Tang dynasty, bringing his subordinates with him. The Cefu Yuangui records that the Tang court recognized Ashina Chengqing's status, granting him the titles of Grand Guardian (太保) and Prince of Dingxiang (Chinese: 定襄王, romanized: Dìngxiāng Wáng). His relative Ashina Congli surrendered at the same time and was named Prince of Guiyi.

During this period, the Tang general Li Guangbi plotted to assassinate Shi Siming using a defector named Wu Cheng'en (烏承恩). The plotters attempted to bribe Ashina Chengqing with an "iron certificate" (Chinese: 鐵券, romanized: tiěquàn; a certificate of immunity), which was to be delivered to him only if he agreed to aid in the assassination. However, the plot was exposed before Chengqing could be approached. When Shi Siming searched Wu Cheng'en's bags, he found the certificate still inside, proving Chengqing had not yet been complicit. Shi Siming executed the plotters but spared Chengqing.

When Shi Siming rebelled against the Tang again, he left his son Shi Zhaoqing (史朝清) in charge of Youzhou, appointing Ashina Chengqing (referred to as "Ashina Yu" in the New Book of Tang) to assist him.

After Shi Chaoyi murdered his father Shi Siming in 761, a civil war erupted in Youzhou between supporters of the two Shi brothers. Ashina Chengqing was upheld as "False Secretariat Director" and "Regent" of Youzhou by the faction loyal to the deceased Shi Siming. He commanded the "Jinglue Army" (経略軍), consisting of 30,000 mixed Han and Turkic troops. He was defeated by the former Yan rebel general Gao Juren, of Goguryeo descent, who ordered a mass slaughter of West Asian (Central Asian) Sogdians in Fanyang, also known as Jicheng (Beijing), in Youzhou. They were identified through their big noses and lances were used to impale their children. High nosed Sogdians were slaughtered in Youzhou in 761. Youzhou had Linzhou, another "protected" prefecture attached to it, and Sogdians lived there in great numbers. Gao Juren wanted to defect to the Tang dynasty and wanted them to publicly recognize and acknowledge him as a regional warlord, according to History of An Lushan. Another source says the slaughter of the non-Hans serving Ashina Chengqing was done by Gao Juren in Fanyang in order to deprive him of his support base, since the Tiele, Tongluo, Sogdians and Turks were all Hu (barbarians) and supported the Turk Ashina Chengqing against the Mohe, Xi, Khitan and Goguryeo origin soldiers led by Gao Juren. Gao Juren was later killed by Li Huaixian, who was loyal to Shi Chaoyi. Ashina Chengqing himself fled to Luoyang to submit to Shi Chaoyi.

In late 762, as the Tang and Uighur armies advanced on Luoyang, Ashina Chengqing advised Shi Chaoyi to retreat to Heyang rather than face the Uighur cavalry directly. The Zizhi Tongjian records his warning: "If [the Tang] come together with the Uighurs, their spearhead cannot be withstood; we should retreat and guard Heyang to avoid them." Shi Chaoyi ignored this advice and was subsequently defeated at the Battle of Hengshui. Ashina Chengqing disappears from historical records following the collapse of the Yan dynasty.

== Family ==
He had a son called Ashina Mingyi (Chinese: 阿史那明義, romanized: Āshǐnà Míngyì; c. 720–757) who was general and Minister in the Great Yan court.
