= Empress Xin (Shi Siming) =

Empress Xin (辛皇后, personal name unknown) (died after 18 April 761) was an empress and wife of Shi Siming, a general of the Chinese Tang dynasty who became an emperor of the rebel Yan state during Anshi Rebellion.

The future Empress Xin was said to be the daughter of gentry. When Shi Siming was young and still poor and of local station, she insisted on marrying him, and eventually got her wish. She had at least one son with him, Shi Chaoqing (史朝清), but his oldest son Shi Chaoyi was not her son. After Shi Siming, who had served under Yan's founder An Lushan, killed An Lushan's son and successor An Qingxu in 759, he declared himself emperor of Yan and created her empress. He was said to have favored both her and her son Shi Chaoqing, and might have created Shi Chaoqing crown prince. When he attacked the Tang eastern capital Luoyang with Shi Chaoyi, he left her at his base Fanyang (范陽, modern Beijing), with Shi Chaoqing in charge. On 18 April 761, Shi Chaoyi, in fear that Shi Siming would kill him, had his father killed first. Shi Chaoyi then sent messengers, in Shi Siming's name, to Fanyang to kill Shi Chaoqing, and Empress Xin was also killed.

== Notes and references ==
- New Book of Tang, vol. 225, part 1.
- Zizhi Tongjian, vols. 221, 222.

Chinese royalty
Preceded by Empress Duan	Empress of Yan (Anshi); 759–761	Dynasty ended
Preceded by Empress Duan	Empress of China (Northern/Central); 759–761	Succeeded by Empress Wang of the Tang dynasty
