= Two-tax system =

Historic form of taxation in China

The two-tax system (Note: simplified Chinese: 两税法; traditional Chinese: 兩稅法; pinyin: liǎngshuìfǎ) was a form of taxation in Tang China introduced in 780 and remained in use until the 16th century, when it was gradually replaced by the Single whip reform. This system replaced the previous head-tax system, known as zuyongdiao, and consisted of two forms of taxation: a land tax and a household tax based on wealth. These taxes were collected at the end of summer and the end of autumn.

== History ==
The tax system of the Tang dynasty, known as the zuyongdiao system, was founded on the belief that all taxpayers owned small and relatively equal parcels of land. Under this system, each peasant was required to pay a standard levy, which consisted of 2 dan (119 liters) of grain in the northern regions and half again as much for rice growers in the south. In addition, they were also required to provide 2 zhang (6.22 meters) of silk fabric (or one-fifth more if they used hemp or ramie instead), approximately 120 grams of thread, and perform 20 days of corvée labor for the state.

The collection of the zuyongdiao tax was based on the assumption that each taxpayer earned an income from their own field. In the second half of the 7th century, during the reigns of Emperor Gaozong and Empress Wu, large estate owners began to absorb the lands worked by independent smallholding farmers. As a result, landless peasants lost their fields and were unable to pay taxes. This led to a growing population of landless peasants who faced difficulties in finding subsistence and were not registered in the tax rolls. As a consequence, they slipped beyond the government's control. The situation only worsened over time, and after the An Lushan Rebellion and the subsequent administrative disarray, the zuyongdiao system lost its effectiveness. The rebellion caused a massive loss of life, and many parts of China gained de facto autonomy from the central government. This resulted in a sharp decline in the number of registered taxpayers, and the zuyongdiao system was no longer able to collect sufficient amounts of grain and cloth.

In addition to the zuyongdiao tax, there were also a household tax paid in coins and a land tax, but these taxes brought in much less revenue. As the number of free smallholding farmers decreased and the income from zuyongdiao declined, the government responded by increasing taxes based on the size of cultivated fields or households. In 780, Chancellor Yang Yan proposed the abolition of the zuyongdiao tax. This led to the consolidation and simplification of various taxes and levies based on land and households into the two-tax system. Under this system, the main taxes for peasants were the household tax and the land tax.

Under the two-tax system, taxpayers were required to pay both a land tax (dishui, 地稅) and a household tax (hushui, 戶稅). The land tax was paid in the form of grain, with the amount varying based on the fertility of the land. This ranged from 11 sheng (approximately 6.5 liters) to 7 sheng per mu (836 m^{2}), with newly reclaimed fields being charged at a lower rate of 2 sheng per mu. The household tax, on the other hand, was paid in coins or, in cases of currency shortages, could be paid in textiles. To determine the amount of household tax owed, households were registered and divided into nine categories based on their wealth and size.

Taxes were collected twice a year: the household tax at the end of summer, and the land tax in autumn after the harvest.

The Tang Empire was divided into circuits governed by jiedushi (military governors) at that time. These taxes were divided into three portions: one for the central government (approximately one-third of the total), one for the subordinate prefectures and counties, and one for their own administrative offices, armies, and reserves. The jiedushi in the northeast had become independent of the central government and did not pay taxes to it, while other regions paid taxes irregularly. As a result, the court could only rely on tax revenues from the southeast and south of the empire.

The introduction of the two-tax system in 780 marked a significant shift in the government's approach to taxing its subjects. It essentially formalized the improvised substitutes that had arisen to replace the zuyongdiao tax. This change had long-term implications, as it acknowledged the real disparities in wealth and levied taxes according to the amount of land owned and the wealth of each household. This was a departure from the previous zuyongdiao system, which assumed egalitarian landholding and imposed the same tax burden on all taxpayers. Additionally, the two-tax system abolished universal corvée labor, which was a major change in the government's approach to labor. While various forms of labor were still required from the populace, they were now demanded on a case-by-case basis rather than through a general obligation. This, along with the earlier abolition of compulsory military service under the fubing system, allowed for greater mobility of labor, which was beneficial for private economic activity.
