= Zu Yong Diao =

Historic tax system in East Asia

Chinese name
- Traditional Chinese: 租庸調
- Simplified Chinese: 租庸调
Transcriptions
Standard Mandarin
- Hanyu Pinyin: Zū Yōng Dìao

Korean name
- Hangul: 조용조
- Hanja: 租庸調
Transcriptions
- Revised Romanization: Jo Yong Jo

Japanese name
- Kanji: 租庸調
- Hiragana: そようちょう

Zu Yong Diao was a way of taxation of Tang dynasty China, pre-modern Japan, Korea and Vietnam. It was established in the seventh year of Wude. The Zuyongdiao consists of Zu (租), the tax paid in grains, Yong (庸) that was paid in corvee and Diao (調) which was paid in textiles.

== In China ==
Zuyongdiao was paired with the policy of land equalization and was effective according to the later policy. The land equalization provides equally divided grain fields to farmers. Every farmer will pay a fixed amount of grain as tax under the name of Zu. The basic unit of tax collection was thus one individual. Yong was a tax paid in unpaid laboring. Every citizen in Tang dynasty works 20 days per year for the government without payment. If the person is handicapped, he or she pays Yong by weaving textiles.

The practice of Zuyongdiao in China was hindered by the An Lushan Rebellion. After the turbulence ended, the Tang court lost a considerable number of individuals who were able to pay the tax (Deaths and casualties during the rebellion were severe). The consequence was that Zuyongdiao no longer collects a sufficient amount of taxes.

The system's weakening also has its sociological factors. It collects taxes one by one from every subject of the imperial court. Since every citizen has to pay his due, one could only afford to pay the tax if he has his own fields to cultivate. However, not everyone possessed grain fields. In addition, during the reign of Emperor Gaozong of Tang and Empress Wu, owners of large plantations began to annex lands owned by self employed farmers. The annexation caused farmers to lose lands and consequently their inability to pay the Zu, Yong and Diao as an individual. The flaw within the system only worsened during the following years. Landless farmers were forced out of their home and became vagabonds, the imperial court had lost the exact registration of households. In the end, local officials had no resource of taxation because objects of taxation were completely lost (Either deceased, fled to other prefectures or in poverty).

In 780, the Zuyongdiao was abolished according to the advice of Chancellor Yang Yan and was substituted by the Two-tax system.

=== Applicable Objects ===
According to the Tang Code edited by chancellor Zhangsun Wuji, the amendment of 27th article states that an object of taxation and corvee has to be a male aged between the age of 21 and 59. Female objects are only responsible of paying taxes if their spouse could not fulfill the duty while there are no male members in the family to substitute. Government officials and physically disabled ones were exempted from taxation and corvee.

== In Japan ==
In 646, Emperor Kōtoku issued the edict of Taika reform. According to the edict of reform written in Classical Chinese, the 4th resolution states that the old way of taxation is to be abolished while So(Zu), Yō(Yong) and Chō(Diao) are established.

In 757, Empress Kōken's Yōrō Code formalized the system of Soyocho.

Although the Japanese Soyocho was based on the Zuyongdiao of China, it differs slightly in terms of specific ways of collecting the three kinds of taxes.

== In Korea ==
The Korean Silla dynasty established the system of Joyongjo according to its Chinese model Zuyongdiao. Household registration system and Joyongjo were together adopted by Silla.

== In Vietnam ==
Vietnam was under the rule of Tang dynasty as Annan province. As a part of China, Annan's taxes were collected in the form of Zuyongdiao. In 1723, the later Lê dynasty of Vietnam enacted the law of Zuyongdiao as well. The policy was promoted by the Trịnh lords as a part of its fortification of rule in southern Vietnam against Nguyễn lords
