= Cui Ning =

General of the Tang dynasty (723 - 783)

Cui Ning (崔寧) (723 – November 10, 783), né Cui Gan (崔旰), was a general of the Tang dynasty of China. For over a decade, he ruled over Xichuan Circuit (西川, headquartered in modern Chengdu, Sichuan) effectively independently from the imperial government, but was eventually kept at the capital Chang'an by the imperial government in 779. Subsequently, when the general Zhu Ci rebelled in 783 and established a new state of Qin, the chancellor Lu Qi, apprehensive that Cui would blame the rebellion on him, falsely accused Cui of being complicit in Zhu's rebellion. Emperor Dezong, believing Lu's accusations, had Cui strangled.

== Background ==
Cui Gan was born in 723, during the reign of Emperor Xuanzong. His family was from Wei Prefecture (衛州, in modern Puyang, Henan), and had a long tradition of Confucian scholarship. Despite this, though, Cui Gang was interested in military strategies. At one point, Ru Zhang (茹璋) the prefect of Wei Prefecture recommended him to be the magistrate of Fuli County (符離, in modern Suzhou, Anhui). After his term of service was complete, however, he was not given another official position. He journeyed to Jiannan Circuit (劍南, headquartered in modern Chengdu) and became a soldier in the army there. He successively served under the military governor (Jiedushi) Xianyu Zhongtong (鮮于仲通) and the general Li Mi (李宓) and participated in Li Mi's campaign against Nanzhao in 754. After Li Mi's defeat that year, Cui returned to the circuit headquarters at Chengdu. The military commander Cui Lun (崔論) was impressed by Cui Gan's appearance and was endeared to him because they shared the same surname, and therefore recommended him to be a commander of the guards for the military governor. Subsequently, Cui Gan served under Cui Yuan and Pei Mian. After Pei was falsely accused and exiled in 762, Emperor Daizong (Emperor Xuanzong's grandson) sent eunuchs to try to investigate Pei for possible misconduct while serving as governor. Cui Gan induced his subordinates to cut off their ears to proclaim Pei's innocence. When the eunuchs returned to capital Chang'an to report this to Emperor Daizong, Cui was recalled to Chang'an to serve as an officer in the imperial forces. Around this time, there was much disturbance in the Shu region (i.e., modern Sichuan and Chongqing), and bandits often blocked off road access. Emperor Daizong was concerned about this, and the official Yan Wu (嚴武) recommended Cui Gan to be the prefect of Li Prefecture (利州, in modern Guangyuan, Sichuan) to combat the banditry. Once Cui arrived at Li Prefecture, the banditry ceased, and this led to fame for him.

== Service under Yan Wu ==
Subsequently, in 764, Yan Wu was made the military governor of Jiannan Circuit, and as he was heading to his post, he went through Li Prefecture. He wanted Cui Gan to serve under him, but as at that time Cui's superior was Zhang Xiancheng (張獻誠) the military governor of Shannan West Circuit (山南西道, headquartered in modern Hanzhong, Shaanxi), Yan did not feel comfortable requesting Zhang to allow him to have Cui as a subordinate. Cui pointed out that Zhang never fully trusted him and that Zhang favored treasure—suggesting that if Yan made the request and also gave Zhang a substantial gift, Zhang would agree. Once Yan arrived at Chengdu, he sent Zhang a gift of rare treasures, and then requested Zhang to allow him to have Cui. Zhang agreed, and Yan commissioned Cui as the prefect of Han Prefecture (漢州, in modern Deyang, Sichuan). At that time, a large part of former Jiannan territory had been captured by Tufan and its allied Qiang tribes. Yan had Cui command an army to attack Tufan, and it was said that because Cui was capable in comforting his soldiers, the soldiers fought hard for him. He was able to recapture four cities from Tufan, and when he returned to Chengdu, Yan showed his favor to Cui by making a wagon with seven kind of jewels to welcome him back into the city.

== Seizure and control of Xichuan Circuit ==
Yan Wu died in 765. His deputy Du Ji (杜濟) served as acting military governor after his death, but there were competing recommendations for his permanent replacement. One of the key officers, Guo Yinggan (郭英幹), and the discipline officer Guo Jialin (郭嘉琳), recommended Guo Yinggan's brother Guo Ying'ai (郭英乂), who was then an imperial official at Chang'an. Cui recommended another officer, Wang Chongjun (王崇俊). Emperor Daizong named Guo Ying'ai as the military governor, and it was said that because of Cui's contrary recommendation, Guo Ying'ai bore a grudge against Cui and Wang. Immediately after he arrived at Chengdu, he made false charges against Wang and executed him. He then summoned Cui, who was then back on the Tufan front, back to Chengdu. Cui, believing it to be a trap, refused. Guo Ying'ai then cut off Cui's army's food supplies and further took an army, ready to attack Cui. His advances were stymied by a sudden snowstorm that killed many of his soldiers and animals, however, and Cui then made a surprise attack, defeating him and forcing him to flee back to Chengdu. At that time, the army at Chengdu was resentful toward Guo Ying'ai because he was arrogant, wasteful, and harsh. Cui seized the moment to publicly accuse Guo Ying'ai of treason—pointing out that Guo Ying'ai had taken an effigy of Emperor Xuanzong out of a Taoist temple dedicated to Emperor Xuanzong and converted the temple to his own mansion. Cui then attacked Chengdu and defeated Guo Ying'ai, forcing him to flee. Once Cui entered into Chengdu, he slaughtered Guo Ying'ai's household, and Guo Ying'ai himself was killed in flight by Han Cheng (韓澄) the prefect of Pu Prefecture (普州, in modern Ziyang, Sichuan), who delivered Guo Ying'ai's head to Cui. Several other Jiannan officers rose against Cui—Bo Maolin (柏茂琳) at Qiong Prefecture, Yang Zilin (楊子琳) at Lu Prefecture (瀘州, in modern Luzhou, Sichuan), and Li Changkui (李昌夔) at Jian Prefecture (劍州, in modern Guangyuan, Sichuan) -- throwing the circuit into a confused state.

Emperor Daizong tried to settle the situation by dividing the circuit—making the eastern half of the circuit into Dongchuan Circuit (東川, headquartered in modern Mianyang, Sichuan) and giving the command to Zhang Xiancheng, making the rest into Xichuan Circuit, while giving Bo and Cui the lesser titles of defender (防禦使, Fangyushi) under the command of the new military governor Du Hongjian, who had been chancellor. Cui did not submit to this arrangement, and when Zhang attacked him in spring 766, Cui defeated Zhang easily. Meanwhile, Du and Cui were exchanging messengers, and Cui acted as respectfully as possible and offered bribes to Du. When Du arrived at Chengdu, Cui treated him with the utmost formal respect but did not permit him any actual control over the governance. In response, Du repeatedly recommended to Emperor Daizong to let Cui become military governor while placating Bo, Yang, and Li Changkui by making them prefects of their prefectures. Emperor Daizong reluctantly agreed, although he initially made Cui only the mayor of Chengdu Municipality and the military commander, under Du. In 767, Du requested to return to Chang'an. Emperor Daizong agreed, and he made Cui the military governor and let Du resume his service as chancellor. Meanwhile, Cui also assured of his position by giving large bribes to Du's powerful chancellor colleague Yuan Zai.

In 768, Cui went to Chang'an to pay homage to Emperor Daizong, leaving his brother Cui Kuan (崔寬) as acting military governor in his stead. Yang took this opportunity to make a surprise attack from Lu Prefecture and briefly entered Chengdu. When the news arrived at Chang'an, Emperor Daizong immediately sent Cui Gan back to Xichuan to put down Yang's uprising—and also bestowed on Cui a new name of Ning (寧, meaning "comfort"). Meanwhile, Cui Kuan initially could not fight Yang off, but Cui Ning's concubine Lady Ren was herself capable in military matters, and she used her wealth to engage a group of soldiers; Cui Kuan was able to use the soldiers she gathered to fight Yang off, and Yang left Chengdu, eventually leaving the circuit by heading east on Yangtze River. Cui Ning subsequently sent Cui Kuan to Chang'an, and because of the large amount of bribes that Cui Ning gave Yuan Zai, Yuan had Cui Kuan and another brother, Cui Shen (崔審), repeatedly promoted.

In 775, Cui Ning reported that he had a great victory over Tufan forces, killing over 10,000 Tufan soldiers. In 776, he again reported a victory over Tufan and its allied Tujue, Tuyuhun, Di, and Qiang tribes, killing over 10,000 soldiers. He repelled a Tufan attack in 777 as well. Meanwhile, it was said that because Xichuan Circuit had natural defenses and was rich, Cui grew arrogant of his position and gathered great wealth. It was also said that he committed adultery with many wives and concubines of his subordinates. The imperial government feared him but could not control him, and had to repeatedly bestow additional honors on him to keep him in check.

== Retention by the imperial government ==
In 779, Emperor Daizong died and was succeeded by his son Emperor Dezong. After Emperor Dezong's ascension, Cui Ning went to Chang'an to pay homage to the new emperor, and was given several high honorific titles -- Sikong (司空, one of the Three Excellencies), chancellor (同中書門下平章事, Tong Zhongshu Menxia Pingzhangshi), director for construction of Emperor Daizong's tomb (山陵使, Shanlingshi), and chief imperial censor (御史大夫, Yushi Daifu). Treating his chief imperial censor title as not just honorary, however, Cui proposed that the subordinate imperial censors be recommended by the chief imperial censor (i.e., himself) rather than by chancellors—and this drew resentment from Yang Yan, who by that point had become the most powerful chancellor at court, despite the fact that they had a previous cordial relationship as fellow associates of Yuan Zai's. The relationship between Cui and Yang was further strained as Yang was repeatedly making accusations against another imperial official, Liu Yan, and Cui was defending Liu.

While Cui was at Chang'an, Tufan and Nanzhao forces launched a major joint attack against Xichuan Circuit, and Cui's subordinates were unable to fight them off. When the news arrived at Chang'an, Emperor Daizong was inclined to order Cui to return to Xichuan Circuit at once. Cui was set to depart, but Yang opposed—pointing out that during Cui's tenure, he had effectively turned Xichuan into an independent realm, not submitting taxes or other resources to the imperial government. Yang argued that even if Cui were able to successfully defeat Tufan and Nanzhao forces, it would be even more difficult to move him later on; instead, he suggested that imperial guard soldiers and elite soldiers from Lulong Circuit (盧龍, headquartered in modern Beijing) -- who had followed their military governor Zhu Ci to Chang'an when Zhu was made chancellor—be sent to fight the Tufan and Nanzhao forces, and once the campaign was over, Xichuan would be back in imperial control. Emperor Dezong agreed with Yang's proposal and kept Cui at Chang'an. Subsequently, Yang claimed that the northern border needed a senior general—someone like Cui—to defend it, and had Cui made the military governor of Shuofang Circuit (朔方, then headquartered in modern Yan'an, Shaanxi). Shuofang was normally a very important and powerful command. However, Yang weakened Cui's authority substantially by naming three deputies for Cui with independent authorities to act—Du Xiquan (杜希全), stationed at Ling Prefecture (靈州, in modern Yinchuan, Ningxia); Zhang Guangsheng (張光晟), stationed at Sui Prefecture (綏州, in modern Yulin, Shaanxi); and Li Jianhui (李建徽), stationed at Fang Prefecture (坊州, i.e., at Cui's headquarters). Yang secretly ordered the three of them to watch over Cui carefully. Nevertheless, Cui and his subordinate Lü Xiqian (呂希倩) -- whom Yang had commissioned as well—were successful in persuading many Dangxiang tribesmen to submit to Tang, and this drew further displeasure from Yang. He had Lü recalled to Chang'an under guise of a promotion and replaced Lü with Shi Changchun (時常春). Eventually, in 781, he also had Cui recalled to the capital, and Cui retained only his honorary title of Sikong but also had him serve as You Pushe (右僕射), one of the heads of the executive bureau of government (尚書省, Shangshu Sheng), but not chancellor.

== Death ==
By 783, Emperor Dezong was waging a number of campaigns against several military governors to the east who were not following imperial orders—Zhu Ci's brother Zhu Tao, Wang Wujun, Tian Yue, and Li Na. He summoned soldiers from Jingyuan Circuit (涇原, headquartered in modern Pingliang, Gansu) to Chang'an, ready to send them to join the campaigns in the east. When the Jingyuan soldiers arrived at Chang'an, however, they were displeased at the lack of imperial awards, and they mutinied, forcing Emperor Dezong to flee to Fengtian (奉天, in modern Xianyang, Shaanxi). The Jingyuan soldiers then supported Zhu Ci as their leader, and while Zhu was initially pretending to be preparing to put down the mutiny and welcome Emperor Dezong back to Chang'an, it soon became clear that he was planning to take over as emperor. Meanwhile, when Emperor Dezong fled out of the city, few imperial officials knew the direction of his flight and therefore few followed him. Several days later, Cui Ning arrived at Fengtian, and initially, Emperor Dezong was pleased. However, Emperor Dezong's trusted chancellor Lu Qi soon received word that Cui had commented:

Our master, the emperor, is intelligent and decisive, and he follows good advice. But he has been led astray by Lu Qi such that he now is in this lamentable state.

Lu feared that Cui would accuse him of causing the calamity, and therefore secretly plotted with an official who had arrived at Fengitan with Cui, Wang Hong (王翃). He had Wang make a secret report to Emperor Dezong that on the way to Fengtian, Cui had frequently stopped to defecate or urinate and appeared to be waiting for Zhu Ci's soldiers. Meanwhile, Zhu, who had declared himself emperor of a new state of Qin, in order to try to create suspicion in Emperor Dezong's minds, also publicly announced that he was making Cui and Liu Hun chancellors. Lu and Wang also forced Cui's secretary Kang Dan (康湛) into forging a letter from Cui to Zhu, offering to betray Fengtian to him. Lu, presenting the forgery to Emperor Dezong, thus falsely accused Cui of treason. Emperor Dezong believed Lu's accusations. He summoned Cui to his presence under the guise of giving him the mission of comforting the Yangtze-Huai River region, and once Cui arrived, had imperial soldiers strangle Cui to death. When Emperor Dezong commissioned the imperial scholar Lu Zhi to issue an edict declaring Cui's guilt, Lu Zhi requested that Lu Qi give him the letter from Cui to Zhu—and Lu Qi then claimed that the letter had been lost. Further, many people were then proclaiming Cui's innocence. As a result, Emperor Dezong, who was initially set to make Cui's family members slaves and confiscate his assets, did neither. In 796, Cui's former subordinate Han Tan (韓潭), then a military governor himself, offered to give up an honorary title he had in exchange to be posthumously declared innocent. Emperor Dezong agreed, and also returned Cui's body to his family for proper reburial.

== Notes and references ==
- Old Book of Tang, vol. 117.
- New Book of Tang, vol. 144.
- Zizhi Tongjian, vols. 224, 225, 226, 227, 228.
