= The Great Big Book of Horrible Things =

2011 book by Matthew White

The Great Big Book of Horrible Things: The Definitive Chronicle of History’s 100 Worst Atrocities
- Author: Matthew White
- Language: English
- Subject: War crimes
- Published: 2011
- Publisher: W. W. Norton & Company
- Publication place: United States
- Media type: Print
- Pages: 669
- ISBN: 978-0-393-08192-3

The Great Big Book of Horrible Things: The Definitive Chronicle of History's 100 Worst Atrocities is a popular history book by Matthew White, a librarian. The book provides a ranking of the hundred worst atrocities of mankind based on the number of deaths.

== Background ==
White, a librarian at the federal courthouse in Richmond, Virginia, wrote the book in 2011. White previously administered the Historical Atlas of the 20th Century on his own website, and became interested in the subject due to constant arguments in cyberspace about who was actually responsible for various atrocities throughout history. According to White, the Atlas been used as source by many authors, including in 377 books and 183 scholarly articles.

== Content ==
The foreword of the book was written by psychologist Steven Pinker. After the foreword, the book chronologically lists the hundred atrocities. Some of these are the Khmer Rouge rule of Cambodia, An Lushan Rebellion, and World War II. White's methodology for creating the list was gathering all available data on atrocities and attempting to discern consensus estimates for each one's death tolls. His focus is on armed conflict, with famine and disease relating to such conflict counting for the statistics, while natural disasters and economic events do not. White says that there is no atrocity for which the statistics can be agreed upon worldwide. One of White's conclusions is that no one system of government is obviously more murderous, and anarchy can be worst of all. He adds that governments do not kill people, rather people kill people. Another conclusion is that chaos is more deadly than tyranny.

== Publication ==
The book was first published in hardcover by W. W. Norton & Company in November 2011. The paperback was published by W. W. Norton in May 2013 under the new title Atrocities: The 100 Deadliest Episodes in Human History. The British edition (Canongate Books, 20 October 2011) is entitled Atrocitology: Humanity's 100 Deadliest Achievements. It has been translated into Italian, Japanese, Portuguese, and Spanish.

== Academic analysis ==
Steven Pinker credited White with creating "the most comprehensive, disinterested and statistically nuanced estimates available", and praised the methodological standards of White and the transparency of sources; however, Pinker said that numbers provided by White are "at the high end of the range". Charles S. Maier, a professor at Harvard University, stated that "these figures are notoriously elusive" and that White "seems to have tried to get the best figures he could". He wrote that most historians feel ashamed about doing this kind of raw exercise, adding that "here's a guy who hasn't been afraid to get his hands dirty". Ben Kiernan, director of the Genocide Studies Program at Yale University commented that "averaging guesses alongside more precise counts can be misleading". Randolph Roth, co-director of the Historical Violence Database at Ohio State University, said that it is difficult to make a quantitative analysis of an event while not knowing about the qualitative side of the context. He praised White's effort to look at the big picture, while adding that "it's going to be hard for many historians to read this book and look at that death toll for Genghis Khan, that 40 million, and not have a sinking feeling".

Rudolph Rummel, professor emeritus of political science at the University of Hawaii, disagreed with White on the extent of democide present in the 20th century. He called White's statistics "not reliable", and said that Joseph Stalin killed 61 million people, rather than the 20 million mentioned in the book by White. He insisted that the difference in numbers is "a profound statement on the nature of Communism".

== Public reception ==
Jennifer Schuessler of The New York Times praised the "stylishly lurid graphics and goofy asides". James Hannaham of The Village Voice stated that the book might start controversy. He picked the example of slavery, saying that White claimed it was nearly eradicated, which he argues is not true if human trafficking is accounted for. He complimented the style of writing, stating that "even reading this world bummer with a grain of salt, you can't resist White's witty prose or put the damned thing down". Bill Blakemore of ABC News praised the elegant use of humor in the book, adding that it is a "fascinating, new, big and easy-to-read reference book". He called the style of writing "crystal clear" and said that "White’s list of the 100 Deadliest Atrocities is full of surprises". Randy Dotinga of The Christian Science Monitor said of the book that "despite being a kind of encyclopedia of evil, it actually manages to be a fascinating read thanks to White's keen grasp of history and his wry take on the villains of the past".
