= Shi Siming =

Emperor of short-lived state in 8th-century China

Shi Siming 史思明

Emperor of the Yan dynasty
- Reign: May 759 (Note: May 759 was when Shi declared himself emperor of Yan (after killing the previous Yan emperor An Qingxu) and changed era name (as recorded in the Zizhi Tongjian; the month (2-30 May 759) corresponds to the 4th month of the 2nd year of the Qianyuan era of Tang Suzong's reign). However, he (at least according to some accounts such as Old Book of Tang) claimed the title of "Great Holy Prince of Yan" (大聖燕王) on 3 February, which corresponded to the first day of the 2nd year of the Qianyuan era of Tang Suzong's reign, some three months earlier; vol.221 of Tongjian also recorded this event. The Zizhi Tongjian Kaoyi had a discussion on the records found in various sources on this event.) – 18 April 761
- Predecessor: An Qingxu
- Successor: Shi Chaoyi
- Born: 703
- Died: 18 April 761 (aged 58)
- Empress: Empress Xin
- Issue: Shi Chaoyi
Names
- Family name: Shǐ (史); Given name: Originally Sūgān (窣干), later Sīmíng (思明)
Era dates
- Shùntiān (順天) 759–761; Yìngtiān (應天) 761
Posthumous name
- Emperor Zhaowu (昭武皇帝)
- Dynasty: Yan
- Occupation: Military general, monarch, politician

Shi Siming (Chinese: 史思明) (19th day of the 1st month, (Note: The Zizhi Tongjian recorded a birthday celebration for An on the jiachen day of the 1st month of the 10th year of the Tianbao era of Tang Xuanzong's reign (751). For that month, the jiachen day corresponds to the 20th day of the month. Thus, if Shi was indeed a day older than An, his birthday should be on the 19th day of the 1st month. However, according to An Lushan Shiji (安禄山事迹) by Tang official Yao Runeng (姚汝能), An's birthday was on the 1st day of the 1st month. If this record is correct, then Shi's birthday would be on the 30th day of the 12th month.) 703? – 18 April 761), or Shi Sugan (史窣干), was the third emperor of the Yan state from 759 until his death in 761.

As a military general, monarch, and politician during the Tang dynasty who followed his childhood friend An Lushan in rebelling against Tang, and who later succeeded An Lushan's son An Qingxu as emperor of the Yan state that An Lushan established.

== Background ==
It is not known when Shi Sugan was born, other than that he was born one day before his friend An Lushan and that they grew up together. He was of Tujue extraction, and was said to be thin with smooth skin, with an impatient disposition. After both he and An grew up, they were both known for their bravery. However, he was poor and of low social station, and was looked down by the people of his locale. However, a Lady Xin, a daughter of local gentry, insisted on marrying him despite her family's opposition, and she was eventually successful in doing so.

== Under Emperor Xuanzong's rule ==
Shi Sugan first served under the Tang dynasty general Wu Zhiyi (烏知義), and it was said that whenever Wu ordered him to attack, he would be able to capture enemy soldiers and return with them. As he and An Lushan each understood six non-Han languages, they both served in military interrogation as interpreters. He later served under the general Zhang Shougui (張守珪), along with An. Early in Emperor Xuanzong's Tianbao era (741–756), because of Shi's repeated military accomplishments, he was made a general at Pinglu Army (平盧, headquartered in modern Chaoyang, Liaoning). Once, when he was in the capital Chang'an to make reports to Emperor Xuanzong, Emperor Xuanzong was impressed with him and patted his back, stating, "You, Lord, will one day be honored. Keep this in mind." He had Shi change his name to Siming (literally meaning, "thinking of brightness"). Shi later served as the governor of Beiping Commandery (北平, roughly modern Qinhuangdao, Hebei). In 751, after a major defeat that An, who was then the military governor (jiedushi) of Pinglu (then converted into a military circuit) as well as Fanyang (范陽, headquartered in modern Beijing) and Hedong (河東, headquartered in modern Taiyuan, Shanxi) Circuits, suffered at the hands of the Xi, Shi reorganized the collapsed troops to prevent further disaster, drawing accolades from An—although Shi commented that if he had met An just slightly earlier after the defeat, he would have been executed, as were Ge Jie (哥解) and Yu Chengxian (魚承仙), two other generals whom An blamed for the defeat. In 752, at An's recommendation, Shi was made Bingma Shi (兵馬使), a commanding officer of Pinglu soldiers.

== During the Anshi Rebellion ==
=== Under An Lushan's rule ===
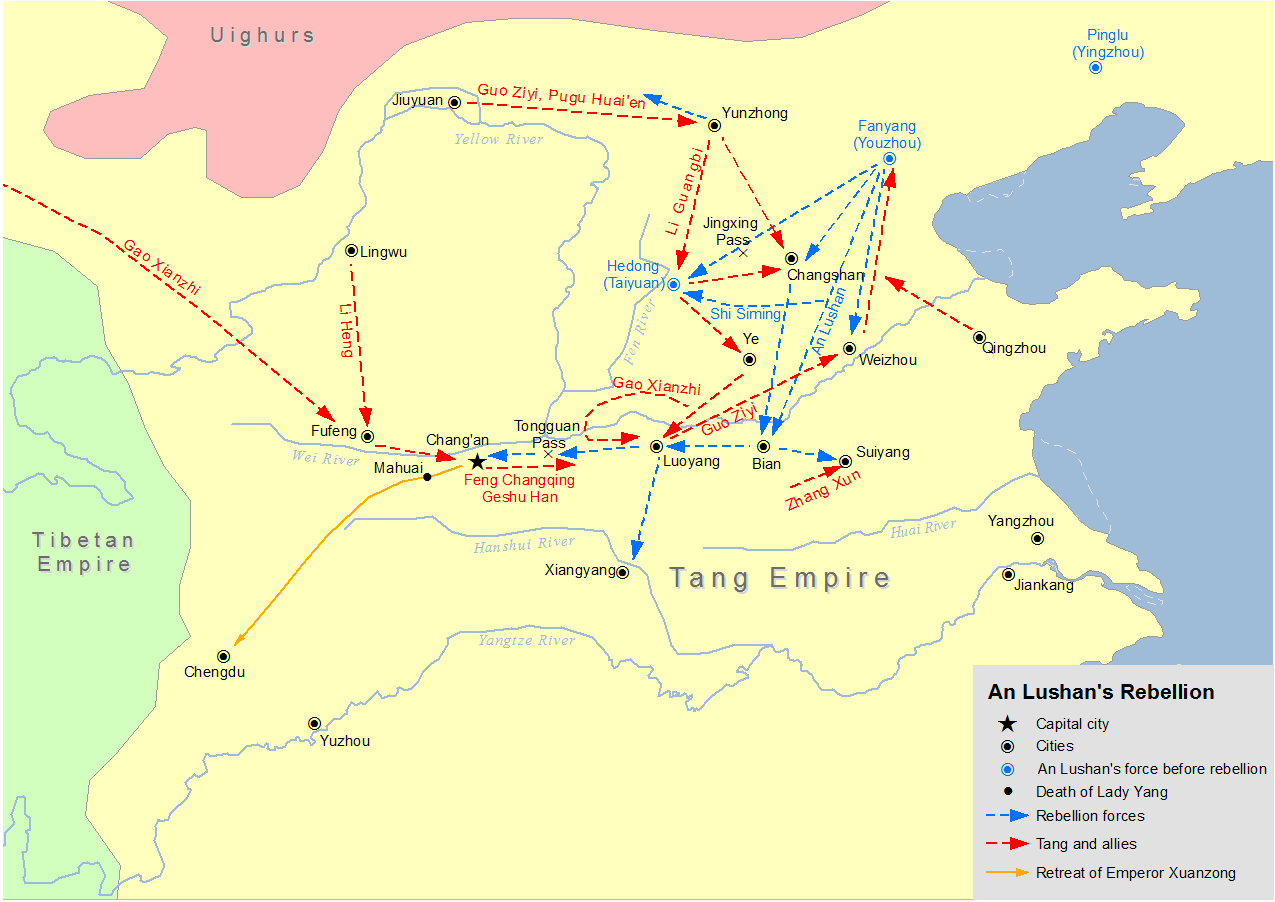
Map of An-Shi rebellion

In 755, An Lushan rose against Emperor Xuanzong's rule, and Shi Siming served under him. Initially, the Tang commanderies north of the Yellow River nearly all submitted to An, allowing An to quickly advance south and capture the Tang eastern capital Luoyang, but around the new year 756, the official Yan Gaoqing (顏杲卿), who had earlier submitted to An, rose against An at Changshan Commandery (常山, roughly modern Shijiazhuang, Hebei), which he was governor of, leading to a flurry of other commanderies turning against An as well. An, who was then at Luoyang, sent Shi and Li Lijie (李立節) to attack Changshan and Boling (博陵, roughly modern Baoding, Hebei) Commanderies. Just eight days after Yan's defection, Shi and Cai Xide (蔡希德) both arrived at Changshan and captured Yan, who was delivered to Luoyang and executed. Shi, Li, and Cai then attacked the other commanderies that had risen along with Yan, and they resubmitted to An, who declared himself the emperor of a new state of Yan. Lu Quancheng (盧全誠), the governor of Raoyang Commandery (饒陽, roughly modern Hengshui, Hebei), however, refused to submit, and Shi put Raoyang under siege but could not quickly capture it, and was forced to lift the siege when the Tang general Li Guangbi arrived with relief troops from Hedong Circuit. Subsequently, he and Li Guangbi and another Tang general, Guo Ziyi, engaged in a number of battles, largely to Shi's detriment, eventually causing many commanderies to rise against An again. This caused An much concern, and at one point, An considered abandoning Luoyang and heading back north. Eventually, however, the situation changed when the Tang general Geshu Han was defeated at Tong Pass by another Yan general, Cui Qianyou (崔乾祐), and Yan troops were able to capture Chang'an and force both Emperor Xuanzong and his crown prince Li Heng to flee—with Li Heng fleeing to Lingwu and declaring himself emperor there (as Emperor Suzong). Guo and Li Guangbi abandoned their campaign against Shi and went to Lingwu as well, thus allowing Shi to largely repacify the region north of the Yellow River for Yan. When Liu Zhengchen (劉正臣), who had risen against An at Pinglu, made a surprise attack on Fanyang, Shi defeated Liu, forcing him to flee back to Pinglu.

=== Under An Qingxu's rule ===
In spring 757, An Lushan was killed by his son An Qingxu, who succeeded to the Yan throne. Meanwhile, though, Shi Siming, who had not received the news of An Lushan's death, attacked Taiyuan, where Li Guangbi was at that point, along with Cai Xide, Gao Xiuyan (高秀巖), and Niu Tingjie (牛廷玠), with 100,000 troops total. They besieged Taiyuan for more than a month, but could not capture it. The news of An Lushan's death then arrived, and An Qingxu further ordered Shi to return to Fanyang to guard it, leaving Cai at Taiyuan to watch Li Guangbi. An Qingxu also made Shi the military governor of Fanyang and created him the Prince of Guichuan. Shi, however, hoarding the supplies that An Lushan had previously shipped to Fanyang, began to disobey An Qingxu's orders, and An Qingxu could not keep him in check. In winter 757, after An Qingxu was forced to abandon Luoyang after a joint Tang/Huihe counterattack, various non-Han tribal troops abandoned An Qingxu and fled north. Shi induced the elite Yeluohe (曵落河) troops, as well as various other tribes, to submit to him, but the Tongluo (同羅) forces refused, and he then defeated them.

Meanwhile, An Qingxu sent the generals Ashina Chengqing (阿史那承慶) and An Shouzhong (安守忠) to Fanyang to requisition troops from Shi, and also see if they could seize Fanyang. Shi, under the advice of his assistant Geng Renzhi (耿仁智), turned against An Qingxu, detaining Ashina and An Shouzhong, and offering to submit to Tang instead, along with Gao. Emperor Suzong was pleased. He commissioned Shi as the military governor of Fanyang and created him the Prince of Guiyi. He also sent the eunuch Li Sijing (李思敬) and Wu Zhiyi's son Wu Cheng'en (烏承恩) to comfort Shi.

=== Brief submission to Emperor Suzong and re-rebellion ===
After Shi Siming's submission to Tang, the other nearby prefectures also largely submitted to Tang, leaving An Qingxu isolated in Yecheng, holding only Yecheng and its surrounding region. However, a number of Tang generals, including Li Guangbi and Zhang Gao, doubted Shi's sincerity. In summer 759, under Li Guangbi's advice, Emperor Suzong had Wu Cheng'en try to persuade Ashina Chengqing into killing Shi together and seizing Fanyang. Shi discovered this and put Wu to death. He did not initially formally turn against Tang, but made an ultimatum demanding Li Guangbi's death. (Note: The Song dynasty/Yuan dynasty historian Hu Sanxing, however, doubted this version of events, pointing out that having Wu persuading Ashina to rebel was an impossible task that Li Guangbi would have known was impossible, and that, after Wu's death, Shi publicly displayed a list of generals that Emperor Suzong had ordered Wu to execute once the plot succeeded, which was implausible given that Tang most likely would have needed to pardon all of Shi's associates if Wu actually killed Shi. Hu opined that Shi contrived the entire situation -- falsely blaming Wu for wanting to kill him, and then manufacturing evidence to make it as if Emperor Suzong and Li Guangbi were persecuting him. See Bo Yang Edition of the Zizhi Tongjian, vol. 53 [759].) Meanwhile, though, with An Qingxu seeking aid from him, he launched his troops and headed south toward Yecheng. Shi quickly captured Wei Prefecture (魏州, in modern Handan, Hebei) from the Tang general Cui Guangyuan (崔光遠), and then declared himself "the Great Holy Prince of Yan" (大聖燕王) in spring 759. (Note: That Shi declared himself the Great Holy Prince of Yan was per the Zizhi Tongjian. According to his biography in the New Book of Tang, the title he declared was "the Great Holy Prince of Zhou“ (大聖周王). Compare Zizhi Tongjian, vol. 221 and New Book of Tang, vol. 225, part 1 Archived 2008-05-28 at the Wayback Machine)

Meanwhile, the Tang generals Guo Ziyi, Lu Jiong (魯炅), Li Huan (李奐), Xu Shuji (許叔冀), Li Siye, Ji Guangchen (季廣琛), Cui Guangyuan (崔光遠), Dong Qin (董秦), Li Guangbi, and Wang Sili (王思禮), were gathering at Yecheng and putting it under siege. An Qingxu tried to fight out of the siege, but was defeated by Tang forces, and his brother An Qinghe (安慶和) was killed. Meanwhile, An sent the general Xue Song to Fanyang to seek aid from Shi, offering the throne to him. Shi thus advanced south toward Yecheng. Meanwhile, Tang forces, under the command of nine generals (with Li Siye having died during the siege), were uncoordinated. On 7 April 759, Shi engaged Tang forces—and, when a storm suddenly arrived, both armies panicked; Shi's forces fled north, and Tang forces fled south, lifting the siege on Yecheng. An Qingxu's forces gathered the food and supplies abandoned by Tang forces, and An thereafter considered, with Sun Xiaozhe (孫孝哲) and Cui the possibility of refusing Shi, who gathered his troops and again approached Yecheng, admittance. Shi himself was not communicating with An, but was feasting his soldiers and watching Yecheng. Zhang and Gao Shang (高尚) requested permission to meet Shi, and An agreed; Shi gave them gifts and let them return to Yecheng. An, unsure what to do, again offered the throne to Shi, which Shi declined. Shi, instead, suggested to him that perhaps they could both be emperors of independent, allied states. An, pleased, exited Yecheng and met with Shi to swear to the alliance.

When An met Shi, he kneeled down to thank Shi for his help, stating:

I did not have the abilities to uphold the empire; I lost the two capitals and was put under siege. I did not know that Your Royal Highness would, on account of the Taishang Huang [i.e., An Lushan], arrive from far to save me from death. I have no way to repay your kindness.

Shi suddenly changed his expression and rebuked An:

Losing the two capitals is nothing worthy to be mentioned. You were a son, and you killed your father and usurped his throne. Heaven, earth, and the gods cannot tolerate you. I am attacking the bandits on behalf of the Taishang Huang, and I will not listen to your flattery.

Shi then executed An Qingxu, his four brothers, Gao, Sun, and Cui. He took over An's territory and troops, but returned to Fanyang and left his oldest son Shi Chaoyi in charge of Yecheng. He soon claimed for himself the title of emperor of Yan. He created his wife Lady Xin empress, Shi Chaoyi the Prince of Huai, and made Zhou Zhi (周摯) his chancellor and Li Guiren (李歸仁), the main chieftain who of the non-Han forces that had submitted to him in 757, his chief general.

=== As emperor ===
Shi Siming soon left Empress Xin's son Shi Chaoqing (史朝清) in charge of Fanyang and headed south. He quickly captured Bian Prefecture (汴州, roughly modern Kaifeng, Henan) and Luoyang, but his further attempts to advance were rebuffed by Tang forces at Heyang (河陽, in modern Jiaozuo, Henan) and Shan Prefecture (陝州, roughly modern Sanmenxia, Henan), and the sides stalemated.

At this time, Shi was described as cruel and prone to kill, terrorizing his army. He favored Shi Chaoqing over Shi Chaoyi and considered creating Shi Chaoqing crown prince and killing Shi Chaoyi. (Note: The sources conflict with each other as to whether Shi Chaoqing was, indeed, created crown prince. His biographies in the Old Book of Tang and the New Book of Tang indicated that he was only considering it, but the Jimen Jiluan (蓟门纪乱), an account of the Anshi Rebellion written by the Tang dynasty historian Ping Zhimei (平致美) no longer extant but often cited by others,"Archived copy". Archived from the original on 2014-02-04. indicated that An did create Shi Chaoqing crown prince. Compare Old Book of Tang, vol. 200, part 1, and New Book of Tang, vol. 225, part 1 Archived 2008-05-28 at the Wayback Machine, with Bo Yang Edition of the Zizhi Tongjian, vol. 53 [761], citing Jimen Jiluan. Sima Guang's Zizhi Tongjian Kaoyi also had a discussion on the topic (in vol.16).)

=== Death ===
In spring 761, Shi Siming began another attempt to attack Shan Prefecture, wanting to attack Chang'an. He had Shi Chaoyi serve as his forward commander, but Shi Chaoyi was repeatedly repelled by the Tang general Wei Boyu (衛伯玉). Shi Siming was angered by Shi Chaoyi's failures and considered punishing him and the generals below him. On 18 April, Shi Siming ordered Shi Chaoyi to build a triangular fort with a hill as its side, to store food supplies, and ordered that it be completed in one day. Near the end of the day, Shi Chaoyi had completed it, but had not plastered the walls with mud, when Shi Siming arrived and rebuked him for not applying mud. He ordered his own servants to stay and watch the plastering. He then angrily stated, "After I capture Shan Prefecture, I will kill you, thief!" That night, Shi Chaoyi's subordinates Luo Yue (駱悅) and Cai Wenjing (蔡文景) warned him that he was in dire straits—and that if he refused to take action to depose Shi Siming, they would defect to Tang. Shi Chaoyi agreed to take action, and Luo persuaded Shi Siming's guard commander General Cao (personal name lost to history) to agree with the plot. That night, Luo led 300 soldiers and ambushed Shi Siming, binding him and then beginning a return to Luoyang with the troops. On the way back to Luoyang, Luo feared that someone might try to rescue Shi Siming, and so strangled him to death.

Shi Chaoyi enthroned as the new emperor of Yan. He was eventually defeated by Tang forces and committed suicide in 763.

== Personal ==
His wife was Empress Xin (created 759, executed 761), mother of Crown Prince Chaoqing. He had three children: Shi Chaoyi (史朝義), the Prince of Huai (created 759) and later emperor of the state of Yan. The other son being Shi Chaoqing (史朝清), the Crown Prince (executed 761) whose mother was Empress Xin. Shi Siming had at least five more sons.

== Popular culture ==
- Portrayed by Wong Chun-tong in 2000 Hong Kong television series, The Legend of Lady Yang
- Portrayed by Lu Xingyu in the 2017 Chinese television series, The Glory of Tang Dynasty

== Notes ==
Regnal titles
Preceded by An Qingxu	Emperor of Yan (Anshi); 759–761	Succeeded by Shi Chaoyi
