= Shi Chaoyi =

Emperor of short-lived state in 8th-century China

Shi Chaoyi 史朝義

Emperor of Yan dynasty
- Reign: after 18 April 761 – before 17 February 763
- Predecessor: Shi Siming
- Successor: None
- Born: unknown
- Died: 763 (before 17 February)
Full name
- Family name: Shǐ (史); Given name: Cháoyì (朝義)
Era name and dates
- Xiǎnshèng (顯聖): 761–763
- Dynasty: Yan
- Father: Shi Siming

Shi Chaoyi (史朝義) (died before 17 February 763) was the fourth and last emperor of the Yan state that was established in Anshi rebellion against the Chinese Tang dynasty. He was the oldest son of Shi Siming, former subordinate of An Lushan, and he overthrew and then killed his father in a coup d'état in 761 and took over as emperor. However, he could not gain the allegiance of his father's subordinates, and was eventually defeated by the joint forces of the Tang dynasty and the Uyghur Khaganate. He committed suicide in flight.

== Background ==
It is not known when Shi Chaoyi was born, but it is known that he was the oldest son of his father Shi Siming (and therefore likely born after 720), and that he was not the son of Shi Siming's wife Lady Xin. The second historical reference made to him was in 757, when Shi Siming, who was a childhood friend of An Lushan and who served under An Lushan during An Lushan's service as a Tang dynasty military governor (jiedushi) and then as the emperor of his own rebel state of Yan, turned against An Lushan's son and successor An Qingxu and submitted to Emperor Suzong of Tang, along with the Fanyang (范陽, modern Beijing) region that he controlled. Shi Siming, after his submission to the Tang, made Shi Chaoyi the prefect of Ji Prefecture (冀州, roughly modern Hengshui, Hebei).

In 758, however, Shi Siming, possibly because of a failed assassination plot against him, possibly at the order of Emperor Suzong and the prominent Tang general Li Guangbi, turned against the Tang again and initially aided An Qingxu, then under Tang siege at Yecheng. In spring 759, Shi Siming was able to have the siege against Yecheng lifted, and then, when An Qingxu met him to thank him, killed An Qingxu. He left Shi Chaoyi in defense of Yecheng and returned to Fanyang. Later that year, when Shi Siming claimed the title of emperor of Yan, he created Shi Chaoyi the Prince of Huai, but did not create him crown prince. Rather, he created his wife, Lady Xin, empress, and favored her son, Shi Chaoqing (史朝清), considering creating Shi Chaoqing crown prince. In summer 759, when Shi Siming launched a major campaign against Tang's eastern capital Luoyang, he left Shi Chaoqing in charge of Fanyang and joined forces with Shi Chaoyi and other Yan generals. He captured Luoyang quickly, but was subsequently repelled in his attempt to attack the Tang capital Chang'an, as he was unable to capture Shan Prefecture (陝州, roughly modern Sanmenxia, Henan).

Meanwhile, by this point, Shi Siming was described to be cruel and prone to kill, terrorizing his army. In contrast, Shi Chaoyi was considered kind and was favored by the soldiers, but Shi Siming favored Shi Chaoqing over Shi Chaoyi and considered killing Shi Chaoyi. In spring 761, Shi Siming began another attempt to attack Shan Prefecture, wanting to make it a springboard to attack Chang'an. He had Shi Chaoyi serve as his forward commander, but Shi Chaoyi was repeatedly repelled by the Tang general Wei Boyu (衛伯玉). Shi Siming was angry at Shi Chaoyi's failures and considered punishing him and the generals below him. On April 18, Shi Siming had ordered Shi Chaoyi to build a triangular fort with a hill as its side, to store food supplies, and ordered that it be completed in one day. Near the end of the day, Shi Chaoyi had completed it, but had not plastered the walls with mud, when Shi Siming arrived and rebuked him for not applying mud. He ordered his own servants to stay and watch the plastering. He then angrily stated, "After I capture Shan Prefecture, I will kill you, thief!" That night, Shi Chaoyi's subordinates and henchmen Luo Yue (駱悅) and Cai Wenjing (蔡文景) warned him that he was in dire straits—and that if he refused to take action to depose Shi Siming, they would defect to the Tang.

Shi Chaoyi agreed to take action, and Luo persuaded Shi Siming's guard commander General Cao (personal name lost to history) to agree with the plot. That night, Luo led 300 soldiers and ambushed Shi Siming, binding him and then beginning a return to Luoyang with the troops. On the way back to Luoyang, Luo feared that someone might try to rescue Shi Siming, and so strangled him. Shi Chaoyi claimed the Yan throne, and sent messengers to Fanyang to have Empress Xin and Shi Chaoqing killed.

== As emperor ==
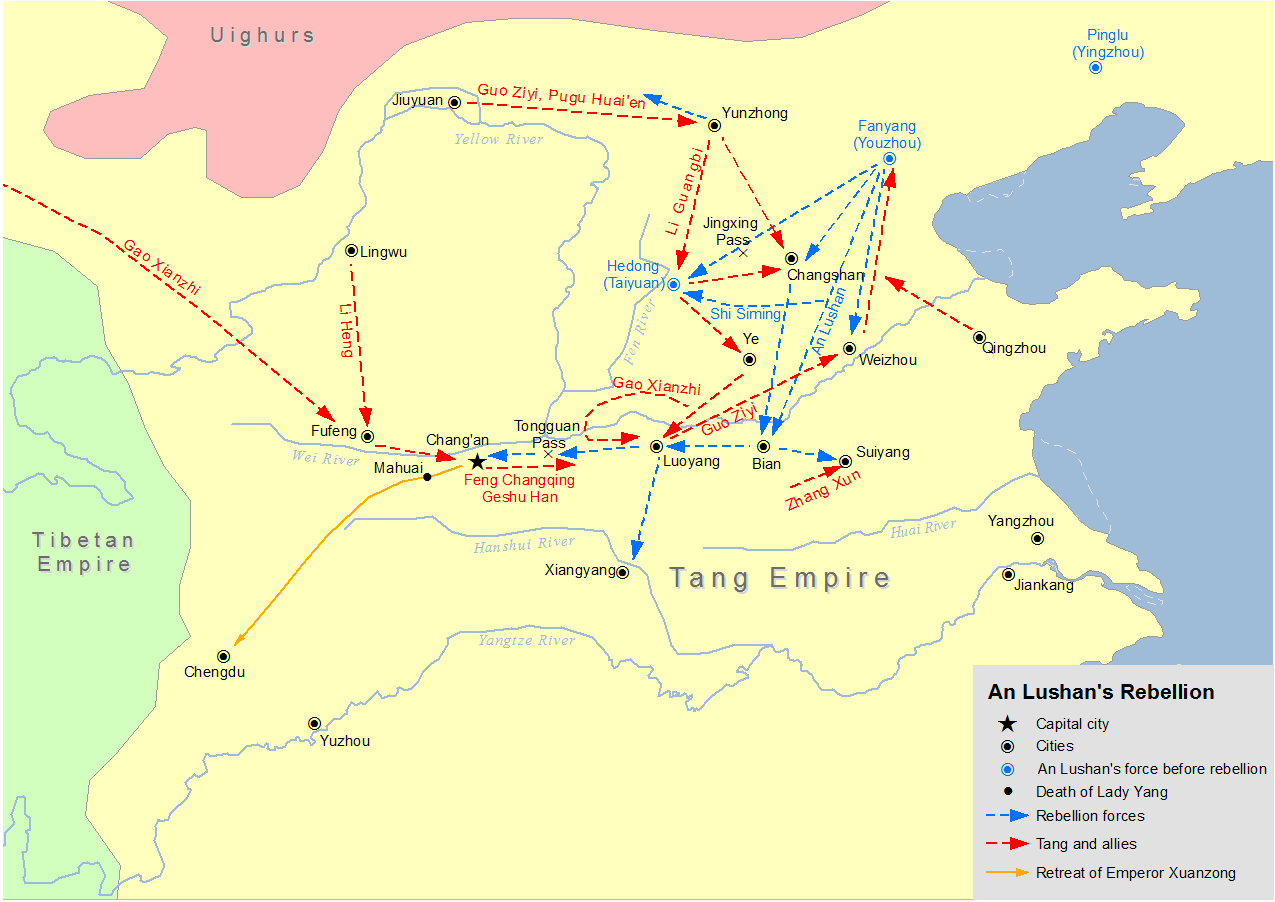
Map of An-Shi rebellion

Shi Chaoyi was considered kind and humble, willing to listen to his advisors. However, he faced the situation that by this time, the Luoyang region, which was directly under his control, had already been ravaged by the wars; many of the other Yan generals had previously been followers of An Lushan, and considered themselves equal to Shi Siming, and therefore were only nominally submissive to the younger Shi Chaoyi.

He thus began to suffer a number of losses at the hands of Tang generals, and his attempts to counter by attacking Tang's Lu Prefecture (潞州, roughly modern Changzhi, Shanxi) and Songzhou ended in failure. However, not until winter 762, when Tang forces were aided by the Uyghur Khaganate's Dengli Khan, did Luoyang fall. Shi Chaoyi left Luoyang and fled, but his generals, including Zhang Xiancheng (張獻誠), Xue Song, Zhang Zhongzhi, Tian Chengsi, Li Huaixian, and Li Baozhong (李抱忠), successively turned against him when he turned to them for aid. He wanted to flee to the Xi or the Khitan, but on the way, in spring 763, he was intercepted by troops sent by Li Huaixian to capture him. To avoid capture, he committed suicide by hanging. Li Huaixian had his head delivered to Chang'an; the head arrived at the capital on 17 February.

Chinese royalty
Preceded by Shi Siming	Emperor of Yan (Anshi); 761–763	Dynasty ended
Preceded by Shi Siming	Emperor of China (Northern/Central); 761–763	Succeeded by Emperor Daizong of Tang
