= Yan (An–Shi) =

State during the An Lushan rebellion (756–763)

Yan 燕
- 756–763
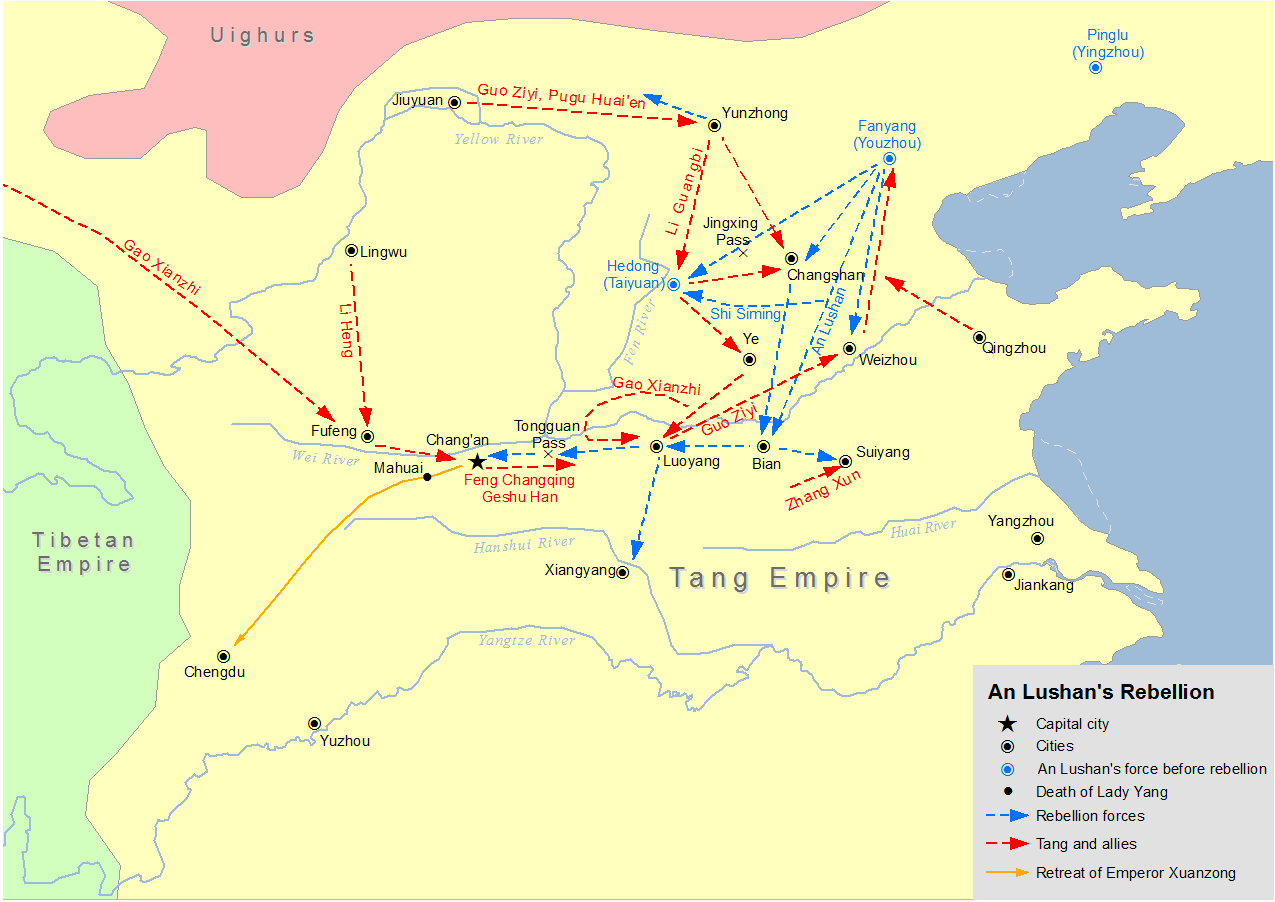
- Map showing the An Lushan Rebellion
- Capital: Luoyang (756–757); Yecheng (757–759); Fanyang (759); Luoyang (759–762)
- Common languages: Chinese
- Religion: Buddhism, Taoism, Confucianism, Chinese folk religion
- Government: Monarchy
- Emperor
  - 756–757: An Lushan, 1st
  - 757–759: An Qingxu, 2nd
  - 759–761: Shi Siming, 3rd
  - 761–763: Shi Chaoyi, 4th
- Historical era: An Lushan Rebellion
  - An Lushan's self-declaration as emperor: February 5 756
  - Shi Chaoyi's suicide: 763
- Currency: Chinese coin, Chinese cash
| Preceded by | Succeeded by |
| Tang dynasty | Tang dynasty |
- Today part of: China

Yan (Chinese: 燕; pinyin: Yān), also known as the Great Yan (Chinese: 大燕; pinyin: Dà Yān), was a dynastic state of China established in 756 by the former Tang general An Lushan, after he rebelled against Emperor Xuanzong of Tang in 755. The state collapsed in 763 with the death of An Lushan's former subordinate Shi Chaoyi (son of Shi Siming), who was the last person to claim the title as emperor of Yan.

== Rulers of Yan ==
Great Yan (燕; 756–763)
| Personal name | Reign | Era name |
|---|---|---|
| An Lushan (安祿山) | 5 February 756 – 29 January 757 (11 months and 24 days) | Shèngwǔ (聖武) 756–758 |
| An Qingxu (安慶緒) | 30 January 757 – 10 April 759 (2 years, 2 months and 11 days) | Xiànchū (現初) 757; Tiānchéng (天成) 757–759 |
| Shi Siming (史思明) | 9 May 759 – 18 April 761 (1 year, 11 months and 9 days) | Shùntiān (順天) 759 (?) |
| Shi Chaoyi (史朝義) | April 761 – February 763 (1 year and 10 months) | Xiǎnshèng (顯聖) 761–763 |

An Lushan (10 February 703 – 29 January 757,) ruled as a Jiedushi under Xuanzong and rebelled on 16 December 755. He proclaimed himself emperor in Luoyang, the eastern capital. He then captured Chang'an, the western capital, in July 756. An Lushan was of unknown origins from his paternal side. His rebellion led to one of the bloodiest wars in human history. He was murdered by his son.

An Qingxu, son of An Lushan, succeeded his father. He was murdered by rebels.

Shi Siming (703–761, age 58), a lieutenant under An Lushan, succeeded An Qingxu. He was murdered by his son.

Shi Chaoyi, son of Shi Siming, succeeded his father. He committed suicide after losing Luoyang to Li Huaixian.

== Sources ==
- Liu Xu (劉昫) (1960) [945]. Biography of An Lu-shan. Old Book of Tang. Translated by Howard S. Levy.
- Moule, Arthur C. (1957). The Rulers of China, 221 BC–AD 1949. London: Routledge. OCLC 223359908.
- Yao Ju-n̂eng (姚汝能) (1962) [8th century]. Histoire de Ngan Lou-chan. Translated by Robert des Rotours [in French].
- Twitchett, Denis; Fairbank, John K., eds. (1979). The Cambridge History of China 3: Sui and T'ang China. Cambridge: Cambridge University Press. ISBN 978-0-521-21446-9.
- Xiong, Victor Cunrui (2009). Historical Dictionary of Medieval China. Lanham: Scarecrow Press. ISBN 978-0-8108-6053-7.
