= Hun Jian =

Hun Jian (simplified Chinese: 浑瑊; traditional Chinese: 渾瑊; pinyin: Hún Jiān; 736 – January 1, 800), né Hun Jin (渾進), posthumous name Prince Zhongwu of Xianning (咸寧忠武王), was a Tiele-Chinese general of the Tang dynasty. He was most-well known for his battles to protect Emperor Dezong during Zhu Ci's rebellion.

== Background and early service ==
Hun Jian (who was initially named Hun Jin, but who subsequently changed his name to Hun Jian after he later became prominent) was born in 736, during the reign of Emperor Xuanzong. His ancestors were chieftains of the Hun tribe (渾), one of the nine main constituent tribes of the Tiele Confederation. After the Tiele tribes largely submitted to Tang rule during the reign of Emperor Xuanzong's great-grandfather Emperor Taizong, the Hun tribe was incorporated as a border prefecture, the Gaolan Prefecture (臯蘭州). Hun Jian's great-great-grandfather Hun Atanzhi (渾阿貪支) was given the title of prefectural prefect of Gaolan. His great-grandfather Hun Yuanqing (渾元慶), grandfather Hun Dashou (渾大壽), and father Hun Shizhi (渾釋之) all carried the title of commandant at Gaolan Prefecture.

Hun Shizhi served in the army at Tang's Shuofang Circuit (朔方, headquartered in modern Yinchuan, Ningxia) and, for his repeated accomplishments there, was made a general and created the Prince of Ningshuo. In 746, when Hun Jian was 10, he began to follow his father on fall tours to defend the Tang border. His father's superior, the military governor (jiedushi) of Shuofang, Zhang Qiqiu (張齊丘), saw him, and jokingly asked him, "Did you come with your wet nurse?" Yet, even at his young age, he had battlefield accomplishments that year. In 748, he served under his father in defeating the Helu (賀魯) tribe and, by this point, he was said to be braver than the other soldiers in the army. When the ethnically Tujue general Li Xianzong (李獻忠) rebelled in 752, the military governor of Shuofang at that time, An Sishun, had Hun Jian command troops against Li Xianzhong, and subsequently, he was promoted.

After the general An Lushan (An Sishun's cousin) rebelled at Fanyang (范陽, in modern Beijing) in 755 and soon established his own state of Yan, Hun Jian served under Li Guangbi in attacking Yan territory north of the Yellow River. In one battle, he personally battled and killed a fierce Yan general, Li Lijie (李立節) and was subsequently made a general. After Emperor Xuanzong was forced to abandon the capital Chang'an in 756 and flee to Chengdu, Emperor Xuanzong's son and crown prince Li Heng was declared emperor at Lingwu (as Emperor Suzong). Hun led his troops to Lingwu to aid Emperor Suzong, and on the way, while marching through Tiande Base (天德軍, in modern Bayan Nur, Inner Mongolia), he defeated an incursion by a non-Han Chinese tribe. Subsequently, he served under the general Guo Ziyi in Emperor Suzong's campaign to recapture Chang'an and the eastern capital Luoyang from An Lushan's son and successor An Qingxu in 757. For these accomplishments, he received a series of honorary titles.

== During Emperor Daizong's reign ==
Later, in 762, during the reign of Emperor Suzong's son Emperor Daizong, Hun Jian served under Pugu Huai'en in the final campaign that destroyed Yan's last emperor Shi Chaoyi, and fought innumerable battles during the campaign. For his accomplishments, he was given the honorific title Kaifu Yitong Sansi (開府儀同三司) and given 200 households in his fief.

In 764, after Pugu rebelled against Emperor Daizong, he had his son Pugu Yang (僕固瑒) and Hun lead troops in attacking Yuci (榆次, in modern Jinzhong, Shanxi). Pugu Yang was soon killed by his subordinates, however, and Hun resubmitted to the imperial government after that, again serving under Guo Ziyi. That year, his father Hun Shizhi died, but he was recalled from his mourning back to military service. In 765, during a major Tufan incursion, he fought the Tufan forces at Fengtian (奉天, in modern Xianyang, Shaanxi, inflicting many casualties on the Tufan troops and forcing them to withdraw. In 767, when Guo attacked Zhou Zhiguang (周智光), the rebellious military governor of Tonghua Circuit (同華, headquartered in modern Weinan, Shaanxi), Hun and Li Huaiguang served as the forward commanders, although Zhou's own subordinates killed him and surrendered before Guo's Shuofang army arrived.

In 773, during a major Tufan incursion, Guo put Hun in charge of commanding 5,000 men against the incursion, and he encountered Tufan forces at Yilu (宜祿, in modern Xianyang). He set up fences to try to stop Tufan cavalry advances, but his subordinates Shi Kang (史抗) and Wen Ruya (溫儒雅), who were more senior than he was, did not take his orders seriously; they removed the fences and charged the Tufan forces. When they could not penetrate through Tufan lines, Tufan forces counterattacked and routed Tang forces, killing over 80% of the Tang forces and capturing over 1,000 civilians. After Tufan forces defeated another Tang general, Ma Lin (馬璘), Hun, while apologizing to Guo for the defeat, asked for another chance. Guo had him head toward Chaona (朝那, in modern Guyuan, Ningxia), and he set up a trap for Tufan forces, defeating them and rescuing the Tang civilians who had been captured. Tufan forces then retreated. In 778, after Tang forces had some border conflicts with Huige forces, Guo put Hun in charge of defending Zhenwu Base (振武軍, in modern Hohhot, Inner Mongolia), on the border with Huige. Afterwards, Huige forces withdrew.

== During Emperor Dezong's reign ==
=== Before Zhu Ci's rebellion ===
Emperor Daizong died in 779 and was succeeded by his son Emperor Dezong. Emperor Dezong, believing that Guo Ziyi was too lax and had too large of a responsibility area, honored Guo as Shangfu (尚父, "like an imperial father") but stripped him of his commands. He divided Guo's responsibility area among Li Huaiguang, Hun Jian, and Chang Qianguang (常謙光), making Hun the military governor of Zhenwu Circuit (振武, headquartered in modern Hohhot), governing the bases and prefectures on the northern border with Huige. Later in the year, however, when Cui Ning was made the military governor of Shuofang Circuit, Zhenwu was merged back into Cui's command, and Emperor Dezong recalled Hun to serve as a general of the imperial guards, as one of the two generals in charge of security at Chang'an. In 783, after Li Xilie, the military governor of Huaining Circuit (淮寧, headquartered in modern Xuchang, Henan) rebelled, Li Xilie forged letters from Hun, hoping to falsely implicate Hun in the rebellion. Hun defended himself against charges when the letters were intentionally left for imperial authorities to find, and Emperor Dezong, believing him, not only did not punish him but awarded him with a horse and silk, and made him part of the army staff against Li Xilie.

=== During Zhu Ci's rebellion ===
In fall 783, soldiers from Jingyuan Circuit (涇原, headquartered in modern Pingliang, Gansu), at Chang'an to be deployed to the east, mutinied when they became angry that they did not get rewards from Emperor Dezong. Emperor Dezong was forced to flee to Fengtian (奉天, in modern Xianyang), and the mutineers supported the general Zhu Ci, who had been forced into retirement due to a rebellion by his brother Zhu Tao in 782, as their leader. Three days after Emperor Dezong arrived at Fengtian, Hun and his family members arrived at Fengtian as well, and it was said that due to his presence, Emperor Dezong's followers became calmed. Emperor Dezong made Hun the military governor of the Jingji (京畿, i.e., Chang'an and vicinity) and Weibei (渭北, i.e., the region north of the Wei River) regions, in charge of the troops that had followed Emperor Dezong to Fengtian.

Subsequently, Zhu Ci claimed the title of emperor of a new state of Qin, and he put Fengtian under siege. It was said that during the siege, Hun and Han Yougui (韓遊瓌) had to fight day and night without rest to fight off the Qin troops. With the siege continuing and Qin forces sieging Fengtian on three sides, but Fengtian's defenses holding, Emperor Dezong, apparently to reward Hun, added the Weinan (渭南, i.e., the region south of the Wei River) region, as well as Jin (金州, in modern Ankang, Shaanxi) and Shang (商州, in modern Shangluo, Shaanxi) Prefectures to his responsibility. At one point, the situation of Fengtian became so desperate that Emperor Dezong gave Hun the authorization to issue imperial edicts (i.e., if Emperor Dezong himself had become captured or killed) and said to him, "This is farewell to you, Lord." With Hun encouraging the troops, however, the troops fought off the Qin troops, which were eventually forced to lift the siege on Fengtian and return to Chang'an after Li Huaiguang arrived in the vicinity to save Emperor Dezong.

However, in the aftermaths of Fengtian's siege being lifted, Emperor Dezong offended Li Huaiguang by refusing to meet him and sending him, along with other generals Li Sheng, Li Jianhui (李建徽), and Yang Huiguang (楊惠光), toward Chang'an to combat Zhu. In spring 784, Li Huaiguang rebelled as well, and when Hun received the news, he put army accompanying Emperor Dezong on high alert and escorted Emperor Dezong safely to Liang Prefecture (梁州, in modern Hanzhong, Shaanxi). Eventually, though, with Li Huaiguang's subordinates turning against him, Li Huaiguang withdrew to Hezhong (河中, in modern Yuncheng, Shanxi), allowing Li Sheng to prepare to attack Zhu. Emperor Dezong made Hun the military governor of Shuofang Circuit and gave him the honorary chancellor designation Tong Zhongshu Menxia Pingzhangshi (同中書門下平章事). When Emperor Dezong bestowed these offices on Hun, he held an elaborate ceremony intended to emulate the ceremony that Emperor Gao of Han held for Han Xin when making Han the commander of his army. He sent Hun back to the Chang'an region to attack Zhu with Li Sheng and Han Yougui. In summer 784, the joint Tang forces recaptured Chang'an and forced Zhu to flee; Zhu was eventually killed in flight by his own subordinates, and Emperor Dezong returned to Chang'an.

=== After Zhu Ci's rebellion ===
Before returning to Chang'an, Emperor Dezong made Hun Jian Shizhong (侍中), the head of the examination bureau of government (門下省, Menxia Sheng) and a post considered one for a chancellor. In the subsequent celebration of the victory of Zhu Ci, when Emperor Dezong was honoring the generals, Li Sheng was honored first, and Hun was honored second. Subsequently, Emperor Dezong made Hun the military governor of Hezhong Circuit, then under Li Huaiguang's control, intending to have him attack Li Huaiguang. He also created Hun the Prince of Xianning.

Hun, however, was initially not able to make much headway against Li Huaiguang, but after Ma Sui opened another front to Li Huaiguang's east, the imperial forces began to seize Li Huaiguang's territory bit by bit. By spring 785, Hun, Ma, and Han Yougui had joined forces and were approaching Hezhong. Li Huaiguang, facing defeat, committed suicide. Hun took over Li Huaiguang's troops and remained at Hezhong. Emperor Dezong made him acting Sikong (司空, one of the Three Excellencies).

In 787, during the middle of a major Tufan incursion, Li Sheng, Hun, and Ma all led forces against Tufan, but Tufan's chancellor Nanam Shang Gyaltsen Lhanang ("Shang Jiezan" (尚結贊) in Chinese) convinced Ma that he was interested in peace, and Emperor Dezong agreed to make peace despite Li Sheng's opposition. Per Shang's request, Emperor Dezong sent Hun, as his emissary, to meet Shang at Pingliangchuan (平涼川, in modern Pingliang). Li Sheng, fearing Tufan treachery, instructed Hun to be careful, but Zhang, hearing this, accused Li Sheng of interfering with the peace with Tufan. Emperor Dezong thus instructed Hun to be relaxed and not to aggravate Tufan in any way. On July 8, 787, at the meeting site, Shang laid a trap for Hun and launched a sudden attack, killing and capturing many of Hun's attendants, but Hun escaped. Subsequently, joining forces with Han and Luo Yuanguang (駱元光), they were able to hold off a Tufan assault on Chang'an. When Hun returned to Chang'an, he wore mourning clothes and apologized for the defeat, but Emperor Dezong had him change back into official uniform. For a few months, Hun remained in the region in case of another Tufan attack, but by winter 787, per Emperor Dezong's orders, he returned to Hezhong. He died on January 1, 800, and was mourned and buried with great honor.

It was said that Hun was studious, and understood the Spring and Autumn Annals and the Book of Han well. Imitating the style of the autobiography of Sima Qian (the author of the Records of the Grand Historian), he wrote a record of his own campaigns, in which he described his campaigns plainly without bragging. Despite his great accomplishments, he remained humble and careful in serving the emperor, and whenever he received imperial rewards, he would always kneel to receive them. The popular opinion at the time compared him to Jin Midi of the Han dynasty. After Zhu Ci's rebellion, Emperor Dezong often feared rebellions by generals and would often appease them by agreeing to all of their requests, but did not do so with Hun. Hun was pleased by this and stated, "The Emperor does not suspect me!"

== Notes and references ==
- Old Book of Tang, vol. 134.
- New Book of Tang, vol. 155.
- Zizhi Tongjian, vols. 223, 224, 225, 228, 229, 230, 231, 232, 233, 235.
