= Wang Zhongsi =

Chinese military general and politician

Wang Zhongsi (Chinese: 王忠嗣; 704?–748?), né Wang Xun (王訓), was a Chinese military general and politician during the Tang dynasty. Because of how his father Wang Haibin (王海賓) had died in army service, Emperor Xuanzong took him and raised him in the palace, and subsequently entrusted him with army commands. Eventually, though, he was accused of intentionally hindering an attack on Tubo, and was demoted. He died the following year.

== Background ==
Wang Xun was possibly born in 704, at the end of the reign of Wu Zetian. His family was originally from Taiyuan, but by the time of his birth was located in Hua Prefecture (華州, roughly modern Weinan, Shaanxi). His father Wang Haibin was known for his bravery in army service, and carried the title of Baron of Taigu. In 714, during the reign of Wu Zetian's grandson Emperor Xuanzong, there was a major Tibetan, or Tubo, incursion, and Emperor Xuanzong sent the general Xue Na to defend against it. Wang Haibin, who was then the commander of Feng'an Base (豐安軍, in modern Wuzhong, Ningxia), served under Xue, who was successful in defeating the Tibetan forces. Wang Haibin was killed in the campaign, however, and as a result, Emperor Xuanzong changed Wang Xun's name to Wang Zhongsi (which meant "heir of the faithful"), took him into the palace, and raised him there, giving him the honorific titles of Chaosan Daifu (朝散大夫) and imperial vehicle director (尚輦奉御, Shangnian Fengyu). He became a friend of Emperor Xuanzong's son Li Sisheng the Prince of Zhong and often spent time at Li Sisheng's mansion. After Wang Zhongsi had grown up, he was said to be handsome, silent, and serious, with military talent. As he was the son of a general, Emperor Xuanzong often discussed military matters with him, and Emperor Xuanzong was impressed with his responses, stating, "He will surely be a good general later." In 730, Emperor Xuanzong bestowed additional posthumous honors on Wang Haibin.

== Service in army ==
Wang Zhongsi later served under the generals Xiao Song and Li Hui (李褘) the Prince of Xin'an (Emperor Xuanzong's second cousin). By 733, Wang was a general, serving at Hexi Circuit (河西, headquartered in modern Wuwei, Gansu) and carrying the title of Baron of Qingyuan. On one occasion, however, he offended Wang Yu (王昱), the sworn brother of the official Huangfu Weiming (皇甫惟明), and as a result, Huangfu made accusations against him, and he was demoted to be a recruiting officer (果毅, Guoyi). In 738, when the general Du Xiwang (杜希望) was set to attack Tubo, his subordinates recommended Wang, and Du retained Wang to serve under him. Wang subsequently contributed much to a victory over Tubo, and was promoted back to general status, and was soon made the deputy military governor (jiedushi) of Hedong Circuit (河東, headquartered in modern Taiyuan). In 740, he was made the military governor of Hedong. In 741, he was made the military governor of Shuofang Circuit (朔方, headquartered in modern Yinchuan, Ningxia), but continued to oversee Hedong as well until Tian Renwan (田仁琬) was given Hedong.

In 742, three subordinate tribes to Eastern Tujue, Baximi, Huige, and Geluolu (葛邏祿), rebelled against Eastern Tujue's khan Ashina Guduo and killed him. Eastern Tujue subsequently broke into halves, with the chieftain of Baximi, who took the title of Jiadeyishi Khan, and the son of the Eastern Tujue duke Ashina Panjue (阿史那判闕), who took the title of Wusumishi Khan, each claiming to be khan. Emperor Xuanzong sent emissaries to Wusumishi Khan, advising him to submit to Tang, but Wusumishi Khan refused. Wang then launched his troops to pressure Wusumishi Khan, who became fearful and indicated that he was willing to submit, but took no actual action to do so. Wang then persuaded Baximi, Huige, and Geluolu to attack him. He fled, and Wang captured part of his people and returned to Tang territory. For his contributions, Wang was given a greater general title.

In 744, Baximi attacked Wusumishi Khan and killed him. Wusumishi Khan's people supported his brother Ashina Gulongfu as Baimei Khan. Under Emperor Xuanzong's orders, Wang launched his troops to attack Ashina Gulongfu, defeating him. Subsequently, Huige and Geluolu forces killed both Ashina Gulongfu and Jiadeyishi Khan, and Huige's chieftain Yaoluoge Gulipeiluo established a new khanate as its khan. Emperor Xuanzong created Yaoluoge Gulipeiluo as Huairen Khan. In 745, Wang was created the greater title of Duke of Qingyuan.

In 745, Wang was given the military governorship of Hedong as well as Shuofang. It was said that he considered himself brave, but took comforting the border region as his priority, often stating:

A general in peaceful times should comfort and train soldiers. He should not expend the power of the empire to try to gain achievements.

Wang's philosophy was so strict on this that it was said that his soldiers were often itching for a fight. He, however, was accustomed to send intelligence officers to spy on the enemy, to see when attacks could be launched successfully, before doing so. Once he took the commands of both Shuofang and Hedong, he built many forts on the border for defensive purposes, and many considered him a superior commander of that region than everyone since Zhang Rendan. Further, it was said that he intentionally paid an overly high price for horses, and as a result, non-Han tribes would often sell their horses to him, thus increasing the Tang army's horse supply while reducing potential enemies'.

In 746, Wang was given the military governorships of Hexi and Longyou (隴右, headquartered in modern Haidong Prefecture, Qinghai), but continued to oversee Hedong and Shuofang as well. Under his request, 9,000 horses were delivered from Hedong and Shuofang to Hexi and Longyou, to strengthen the armies of Hexi and Longyou. It was said that he was successful in battles against Tubo and Tuyuhun remnants. It was also said that, however, he was far more familiar with the people of Hedong and Shuofang than with Hexi and Longyou, and was not as good in governance of those circuits, and that he had gotten arrogant and wasteful in light of his successes, causing his reputation to suffer.

== Removal and death ==
Meanwhile, the powerful chancellor Li Linfu had become apprehensive that Wang might be made chancellor, and was looking for ways to attack him. In 747, An Lushan, the military governor of Fanyang Circuit (范陽, headquartered in modern Beijing), was beginning to consider hoarding power, and he asked Wang to participate in the project of building Xiongwu Castle (雄武城) by sending a group of soldiers—wanting to then hold on to the soldiers and not return them to Wang. Wang, instead, led the troops himself to Xiongwu in advance of the rendezvous date and, after participating in the building project, returned with the soldiers, and submitted reports to Emperor Xuanzong that he believed An was planning treason. Li Linfu, who was then aligned with An, therefore disliked Wang even more. In summer 747, Wang resigned the commands of Hedong and Shuofang and retained only Hexi and Longyou.

Meanwhile, Emperor Xuanzong considered ordering Wang to attack Tubo's Shibao Castle (石堡城, in modern Xining, Qinghai). Wang opposed, stating that he believed that Shibao was in a good defensive position and that it would take several tens of thousands of casualties to capture it. Emperor Xuanzong was displeased, and when the imperial guard general Dong Yanguang (董延光) volunteered to attack Shibao himself, Emperor Xuanzong agreed and ordered Wang to supply Dong with soldiers. Wang agreed, but was secretly hindering Dong's efforts to recruit soldiers by not promising any rewards to soldiers who volunteered for Dong's campaign, persisting in doing so despite advice from his subordinate general Li Guangbi that continuing to do so was unwise. After Dong was unable to capture Shibao, he accused Wang of hindering him. Li Linfu used this opportunity to accuse Wang of planning a rebellion to put Li Sisheng, who was by this point crown prince and who had changed his name to Li Heng, on the throne, hoping to hurt both Wang and Li Heng at the same time. Emperor Xuanzong ordered Wang back to the capital Chang'an and had him interrogated. Subsequently, Emperor Xuanzong ordered the allegations that Wang planned to support Li Heng as emperor be dropped, but that Wang be sentenced for hindering Dong's campaign.

Wang's subordinate Geshu Han, whose achievements impressed Emperor Xuanzong, was made the military governor of Longyou, in his absence. When Geshu was subsequently summoned to Chang'an to meet with Emperor Xuanzong, his subordinates suggested that he bring much treasure to bribe the central government officials to try to save Wang. Geshu responded:

If there is still justice in the world, Lord Wang will not die. If there is no justice, what can money get us?

Geshu subsequently met with Emperor Xuanzong and begged for forgiveness for Wang, offering to give up his own offices and titles to save Wang from death. Emperor Xuanzong initially became irritated and refused to talk with him further, but Geshu kneeled, hit the ground with his head, and cried bitterly. Emperor Xuanzong relented and spared Wang, but demoted him to be the governor of Hanyang Commandery (漢陽, in modern Wuhan, Hubei). Subsequently, he was made the governor of Handong Commandery (漢東, roughly modern Suizhou, Hubei). He died while serving there, probably in 748. In 749, Geshu captured Shibao, but at the loss of several tens of thousands of soldiers, thus affirming Wang's prediction, after which Wang's reputation became posthumously enhanced.

== Notes and references ==
- Old Book of Tang, vol. 103.
- New Book of Tang, vol. 133.
- Zizhi Tongjian, vols. 211, 214, 215.
