= Chen Xilie =

Official of the Chinese Tang dynasty

Chén Xīliè (Chinese: 陳希烈) (died February 11, 758) was an official of the Chinese Tang dynasty, serving as a chancellor during the reign of Emperor Xuanzong. During the An Shi Rebellion, he surrendered to An Lushan and served as chancellor of An's state of Yan at Luoyang. After Tang forces recaptured Luoyang, he was forced to commit suicide.

== Background ==
It is not known when Chen Xilie was born, but it is known that he was from Sòng Prefecture (宋州, roughly modern Shangqiu, Henan). However, nothing else is known about his family, as no family tree was given for him in the table of the chancellors' family trees in the New Book of Tang. Chen was known to be well-studied, particularly in Taoism-related mysticism, and was also a capable writer.

== During Emperor Xuanzong's reign ==
During the middle of Emperor Xuanzong's Kāiyuán era (713–741), Emperor Xuanzong was interested in the classic texts, and often had scholars explain the texts to him. Originally, this was done by the officials Chǔ Wúliàng (褚無量) and Yuán Xíngchōng (元行沖). After Chu died in 719 and Yuan died in 729, Emperor Xuanzong engaged Chen Xilie and Féng Cháoyǐn (馮朝隱) to frequently explain the Tao Te Ching and the I Ching to him. Chen was initially promoted to be Mìshū Shàojiān (秘書少監), the deputy head of the Palace Library, and also succeeded Zhang Jiuling in heading the imperial institute Jíxián Institute (集賢院). Whenever Emperor Xuanzong was writing something of importance, Chen would assist him in drafting the language. In 742, when the official Tián Tóngxiù (田同秀) reported seeing an appearance of Laozi above Dānfèng Gate (丹鳳門), Chen was one of the officials who submitted a statement flattering Emperor Xuanzong for the holiness of his reign.

In 746, after the chancellor Li Shizhi was removed from office due to machinations by his colleague Li Linfu, Li Linfu believed that Chen had a subservient personality and would be easy to control, and therefore recommended Chen to succeed Li Shizhi. Emperor Xuanzong gave Chen the designation Tóng Zhōngshū Ménxià Píngzhāngshì (同中書門下平章事), making Chen a chancellor de facto. It was said that Chen followed Li Linfu's directions in all matters and that Chen merely signed all documents that Li Linfu wanted him to sign. Later, he was made Zuǒ Xiàng (左相), the head of the examination bureau and a post considered one for a chancellor, as well as the minister of defense (兵部尚書, Bīngbù Shàngshū). He was created the Duke of Yǐngchuān (潁川公).

By 752, however, Chen was instead aligned with the rising Yang Guozhong—the cousin of Emperor Xuanzong's favorite concubine Consort Yang Yuhuan—against Li Linfu. When Li Linfu's close associate Wáng Hóng (王鉷) was implicated in a rebellion plot contrived by his brother Wáng Hàn (王銲), Li Linfu tried to extricate him, but Chen and Yang insisted that Wang Hong was guilty and should be further investigated, eventually leading to Wang Hong's being forced to commit suicide. Further, both Chen and Geshu Han also accused Li Linfu of associating with another general who rebelled around that time, the ethnically Tujue general Lǐ Xiànzhōng (李獻忠). This added to the apprehension that Li Linfu had at that point about Yang's rising power, and Li Linfu died in fear around the new year 753.

After Li Linfu's death, Chen continued to serve as chancellor, along with Yang, but actual power was wielded by Yang. It was said that all important matters were decided at Yang's mansion, not at the office of the chancellors. Meanwhile, when Yang was able to successfully posthumously implicate Li Linfu in Li Xianzhong's rebellion, causing Li Linfu to be posthumously dishonored and his family to be exiled, Yang and Chen were created greater ducal titles—in Chen's case, the Duke of Xu—to award them for "discovering" Li Linfu's plot.

Meanwhile, though, Yang was apprehensive of Chen as well, and therefore tried to squeeze him out of power entirely. Chen himself was apprehensive and therefore offered to resign. In 754, Emperor Xuanzong made Chen a senior advisor to his son Li Heng the Crown Prince and removed him from his chancellor position, replacing him with Wei Jiansu.

== During Anshi Rebellion ==
In 755, the military governor (jiedushi) An Lushan rebelled at Fànyáng. In 756, after declaring himself emperor of a new state of Yan, he advanced on the capital Chang'an, forcing Emperor Xuanzong to flee. After his forces entered Chang'an, Chen Xilie, who was distressed over not being in an important position at that time, submitted to An, along with the officials Zhāng Jūn (張均) and Zhāng Jì (張垍). An had them delivered to Luoyang, which he had made his capital, and made Chen and Zhang Ji chancellors.

In 757, by which time An Lushan's son Ān Qìngxù was the emperor of Yan and Lǐ Hēng was the emperor of Tang (as Emperor Sùzōng), Tang counterattacks, led by Emperor Suzong's son Lǐ Chù the Prince of Guǎngpíng and with Uyghur assistance, recaptured Luoyang. Some 300 former Tang officials who had accepted Yan offices, including Chen, changed into mourning clothes and begged for forgiveness. Li Chu had them released, but soon had them escorted to Chang'an, which was by then again Tang's capital. After they formally paid respect to Emperor Suzong and apologized, they were delivered to the supreme court and placed under arrest. They were tried jointly by the officials Lǐ Xiàn, Lǚ Yīn, and Cuī Qì (崔器). Cui and Lü proposed that all of them be executed. Li Xian opposed, instead proposing six different grades of punishment, and Emperor Suzong accepted Li Xian's proposal. 18 officials were beheaded, while Chen and six others were ordered to commit suicide. It was said that Chen was allowed to commit suicide rather than being publicly executed because Emperor Suzong remembered how Emperor Xuanzong had favored him.

== Notes and references ==
- Old Book of Tang, vol. 97.
- New Book of Tang, vol. 223, part 1.
- Zizhi Tongjian, vols. 215, 216, 217, 218, 220.
