= An Sishun =

An Sishun (安思順) (died April 6, 756) was a general of the Chinese Tang dynasty during the reign of Emperor Xuanzong, probably of Tujue (Göktürk) extraction. He was related to another general, An Lushan. After An Lushan rebelled against Emperor Xuanzong's rule in 755, another general who was inimical to An Sishun, Geshu Han, manufactured evidence that An Sishun was complicit in An Lushan's rebellion, and An Sishun was killed.

== Background and flight to Tang territory ==
An Sishun's father's name might have been An Daomai (安道買) and appeared to be of Tujue extraction. An Daomai's brother An Yanyan (安延偃) had married a sorceress, Lady Ashide, who already had a son named Galuoshan, whom An Yanyan adopted and renamed An Lushan. At some point, An Yanyan's tribe suffered a catastrophe, and An Lushan, An Sishun, and possibly An Yanyan, fled to Tang dynasty territory. At that time, another son of An Daomai's, An Zhenjie (安貞節), was serving as advisor to the Tang prefect of Lan Prefecture (嵐州, in modern Lüliang, Shanxi), and so they settled with An Zhenjie.

== Career as general ==
As of 747, An Sishun was serving as the military governor (jiedushi) of Shuofang Circuit (朔方, headquartered in modern Yinchuan, Ningxia), when, as a part of governor movements, Emperor Xuanzong made him the military governor of Hexi Circuit (河西, headquartered in modern Wuwei, Gansu), as well as acting governor of Wuwei Commandery. In 750, he assumed the military governorship of Shuofang as well.

In 751, after Emperor Xuanzong met with and was impressed by the ethnically Goguryeo general Gao Xianzhi, who was then military governor of Anxi Circuit (安西, headquartered in modern Aksu Prefecture, Xinjiang), he issued an order making Gao the military governor at Hexi. However, An encouraged the non-Han chieftains under his command to cut off their ears and lacerate their faces and request that Emperor Xuanzong allow An to remain at Hexi, and Emperor Xuanzong did so.

In 752, in the middle of a rebellion by the Tujue chieftain Li Xianzhong (李獻忠), the chancellor Li Linfu, who was then locked in a power struggle with fellow chancellor Chen Xilie and did not want to leave the capital Chang'an to react to the rebellion (as he was also the military governor of Shuofang), resigned his governorship of Shuofang and recommended An to take over for him. Emperor Xuanzong agreed, and made An the military governor of Shuofang.

Meanwhile, a rivalry had arisen between An Sishun and his cousin An Lushan, then the military governor of Fanyang Circuit (范陽, headquartered in modern Beijing) and the general Geshu Han, then the military governor of Longyou Circuit (隴右, headquartered in modern Haidong Prefecture, Qinghai). Emperor Xuanzong tried to foster better relations between them, and in winter 752 summoned all three to Chang'an. He had the powerful eunuch Gao Lishi hold a feast for the three of them, hoping that they would reconcile—but the feast degenerated into a bitter argument between Geshu and An Lushan, and it was said that instead of improving relations, it worsened their relations.

== Death ==
At some point, An Sishun became aware that An Lushan, who also had a rivalry with chancellor Yang Guozhong, who had succeeded Li Linfu and was the cousin of Emperor Xuanzong's favorite concubine Consort Yang Yuhuan, was planning rebellion due to Yang Guozhong's aggravations. He reported it to Emperor Xuanzong, who did not believe it but nevertheless believed An Sishun to be faithful. After An Lushan did rebel early in 755, Emperor Xuanzong did not punish An Sishun, but recalled him to Chang'an to serve as the minister of census (戶部尚書, Hubu Shangshu). An Sishun's younger brother An Yuanzhen (安元貞) was made the minister of husbandry. An Sishun's subordinate Guo Ziyi was made the military governor of Shuofang.

However, Geshu Han was still inimical to An Sishun, and soon was put in command of the forces against An Lushan. In 756, Geshu forged a letter from An Lushan to An Sishun, and then had the messenger captured at a pass. He presented the letter to Emperor Xuanzong, along with a petition accusing An Sishun of seven crimes. As a result, An Sishun and An Yuanzhen were executed, and their families were exiled to the Lingnan region, despite Yang Guozhong's attempt to intercede on An Sishun's behalf.

== See also ==
- Turks in the Tang military
