= Geshu Han =

Chinese general and prince (died 757)

Geshu Han (Chinese: 哥舒翰; pinyin: Gēshū Hàn; died December 1, 757), posthumous name Prince Wumin of Xiping (西平武愍王), was a Türgesh-Chinese military general of Tang dynasty. A veteran of many battles, he became a powerful general late in the reign of Emperor Xuanzong and in 756 became responsible for defending Tong Pass against the rebel forces of An Lushan.

After being forced by the Chancellor Yang Guozhong to engage An Lushan's forces, he was defeated and subsequently kidnapped by his own subordinate, Huoba Guiren (火拔歸仁), to An Lushan's camp. An Lushan tried to use him to get his subordinate generals Li Guangbi, Lai Tian (來瑱), and Lu Gui (魯炅) to surrender as well, but when those generals refused to do so, put him under house arrest in Luoyang, the capital of An's newly established state of Great Yan.

In 757, after An Lushan's son and successor An Qingxu was defeated by Tang forces and forced to abandon Luoyang, An Qingxu executed Geshu and some thirty other captive Tang generals.

== Background ==
It is not known when Geshu Han was born. His paternal ancestors were tribal chiefs of Western Turkic extraction, bearing the Nushibi Geshu surname and belonging to the Duolu Tuqishi tribe. His grandfather Geshu Ju (哥舒沮) served as an officer in the Tang army, and his father Geshu Daoyuan (哥舒道元) served as the deputy to the Protectorate General to Pacify the West, and thus lived in Anxi Circuit (安西, headquartered in modern Aksu Prefecture, Xinjiang). His mother was a Khotanese princess. Geshu Han's household was said to be rich, and he used the wealth to further what he saw were just causes, and he also drank heavily. When he was 39, his father died, and he spent three years in the Tang capital Chang'an. On one occasion, he was disrespected by the sheriff of Chang'an County, and he took this disrespect as a reason to serve in the military.

== Military service ==
Geshu Han first served under Wang Chui (王倕), the military governor (jiedushi) of Hexi Circuit (河西, headquartered in modern Wuwei, Gansu). He later served under Wang Chui's successor Wang Zhongsi, and, on one expedition that he commanded, an officer of the same rank was his deputy, but, because they were of the same rank, refused to follow Geshu's orders. Geshu had him executed by hammering, and this shocked the other officers into submission. He later distinguished himself in defending against multiple Tubo attacks.

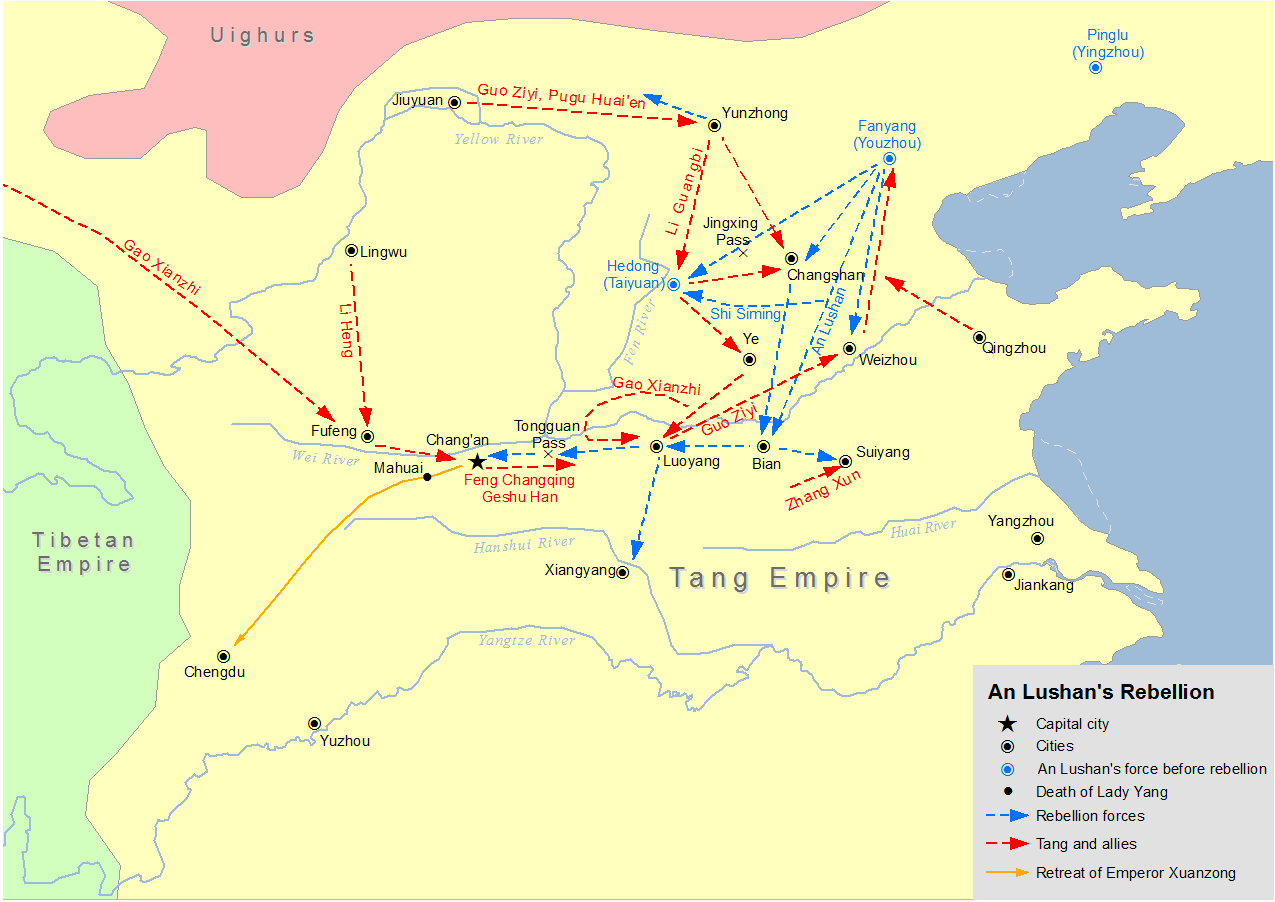
Geshu Han's campaign at Tongguan Pass during the An Lushan Rebellion

In 747, Geshu was promoted to be a general, as well as deputy military governor of Longyou Circuit (隴右, headquartered in modern Haidong Prefecture, Qinghai), which Wang Zhongsi governed at the time as well. At that time, Tufan forces were accustomed to pillage the Tang farms around Jishi Base (積石軍, in modern Hainan Tibetan Autonomous Prefecture, Qinghai) every year at harvest time, to seize the wheat grown in the area—so much so that the people of the region jokingly referred to their region as "Tufan Farms." Geshu, after he took office, had his subordinates Wang Nande (王難得) and Yang Jinghui (楊景暉) hide with their troops, and then confronted the Tufan troops on their next raid. After he engaged them, Wang and Yang cut off the escape, and the Tufan forces were wiped out; this ended the periodic raids on the region.

Later that year, Wang Zhongsi was accused of hindering an attack against Tufan by the general Dong Yanguang (董延光), summoned to Chang'an, and put under interrogation. Geshu, who was then made the acting military governor of Longyou and acting governor of Xiping Commandery (西平, roughly modern Haidong Prefecture), was also summoned to Chang'an to meet Emperor Xuanzong, who was impressed by his achievements. Geshu's subordinates suggested that he bring much treasure to bribe the central government officials to try to save Wang. Geshu responded:

If there is still justice in the world, Lord Wang will not die. If there is no justice, what can money get us?

Geshu subsequently met with Emperor Xuanzong and begged for forgiveness for Wang, offering to give up his own offices and titles to save Wang from death. Emperor Xuanzong initially became irritated and refused to talk with him further, but Geshu kneeled, hit the ground with his head, and cried bitterly. Emperor Xuanzong relented and spared Wang but demoted him to be the governor of Hanyang Commandery (漢陽, in modern Wuhan, Hubei). Geshu's intercession for Wang, at much risk to himself, was praised by others for righteousness.

In 748, Geshu built Shenwei Base (神威軍) upon Qinghai Lake, and Yinglong Castle (應龍城) on an island in the lake itself, as defensive posts against Tufan. When Tufan attacked those outposts, he defeated them, and it was said that thereafter, Tufan forces did not dare to come close to Qinghai Lake. In 749, he also recaptured Shibao Castle (石堡城, in modern Xining, Qinghai), which Wang had refused to attack earlier, leading to Dong's campaign. However, Yinglong Castle fell to Tufan after the Qinghai Lake froze, allowing Tufan forces to attack it over the ice.

In 752, Geshu began to become part of the central government's intrigue in the power struggle between the chancellor Li Linfu and Yang Guozhong, the second cousin of Emperor Xuanzong's favorite concubine Consort Yang Yuhuan, as both he and the chancellor Chen Xilie corroborated accusations that Li Linfu had friendly relations with Li Xianzhong (李獻忠), an ethnically Tujue general who had been forced into rebellion earlier that year. This facilitated Yang Guozhong's aggrandizement of power and the reduction of Li Linfu's influence.

Later that year, when Emperor Xuanzong, seeing that Geshu had poor relations with An Lushan, then the military governor of Fanyang Circuit (范陽, headquartered in modern Beijing) and An Sishun (whose uncle was An Lushan's stepfather), then the military governor of Shuofang Circuit (朔方, headquartered in modern Yinchuan, Ningxia), and wanted to improve relations between these three key commanders of troops at the border, he summoned all three to the capital and had the powerful eunuch Gao Lishi host a feast for the three of them, trying to get them to resolve their unpleasantries. An Lushan tried to talk to Geshu about their Turkic ancestry, but Geshu's response enraged An Lushan, and they got into an argument, which only stopped after Gao gazed at Geshu, stopping him from responding to An Lushan's insults.

In 753, Geshu attacked Tufan again, capturing Hongji (洪濟) and Damomen (大漠門) (both in modern Hainan Tibetan Autonomous Prefecture) and seizing back the nine bends of the Yellow River. He was created the Duke of Liang. Meanwhile, Li Linfu had died, and Yang Guozhong had taken power as chancellor, and soon began to develop a rivalry with An Lushan. He knew that Geshu and An had poor relations, and therefore tried to ingratiate himself with Geshu to build an alliance. At his suggestion, Geshu was given the command of Hexi as well, and was titled the Prince of Xiping. In 754, at Geshu's suggestion, two commanderies, Taoyang (洮陽) and Jiaohe (澆河), as well as a military base, were established over the recaptured region. Around that time, however, Geshu, while bathing, suffered a stroke. He, therefore, left his command and returned to Chang'an in order to recuperate.

In 755, An Lushan, after Yang Guozhong repeatedly had provoked him, rebelled, and the generals Gao Xianzhi and Feng Changqing, after failing to defeat An, were executed. Emperor Xuanzong put Geshu in charge of 200,000 soldiers and had him take up command at Tong Pass, succeeding Gao Xianzhi. In 756, Emperor Xuanzong also gave Geshu the honorary title of Zuo Pushe (左僕射), one of the heads of the executive bureau of government (尚書省, Shangshu Sheng) and chancellor de facto (同中書門下平章事, Tong Zhongshu Menxia Pingzhangshi). Once Geshu got to Tong Pass, his subordinates suggested that he make a surprise attack on Chang'an and kill Yang Guozhong, seeing Yang Guozhong as the cause of An's rebellion—which Geshu rejected, stating, "If that happens, it is Geshu Han who is a rebel, not An Lushan." However, the news was leaked to Yang Guozhong, who, in apprehension, gave his associate Du Qianyun (杜乾運) a separate command, nominally under Geshu. Geshu, now suspicious of Yang Guozhong's intentions, took an opportunity when he summoned Du to Tong Pass to discuss military affairs to execute Du, increasing the tension with Yang Guozhong. Meanwhile, Geshu was still inimical to An Sishun. Geshu forged a letter from An Lushan to An Sishun, and then had the messenger captured at a pass. He presented the letter to Emperor Xuanzong, along with a petition accusing An Sishun of seven crimes. As a result, An Sishun and An Yuanzhen were executed, and their families were exiled to the Lingnan region, despite Yang Guozhong's attempt to intercede on An Sishun's behalf.

Soon thereafter, intelligence reports indicated that An Lushan's forward commander Cui Qianyou (崔乾祐) had weak forces outside the Tong Pass, and Emperor Xuanzong and Yang Guozhong became convinced that it was the time to counterattack in order to recapture the eastern capital Luoyang—despite repeated petitions by Geshu that it was inadvisable, agreed with by Guo Ziyi and Li Guangbi, who were then attacking An's holdings north of the Yellow River and believed that the proper strategy was for Geshu to hold Tong Pass and for them to destroy An's power base first. Yang Guozhong, in particular, was concerned that Geshu was intending to attack him instead, and therefore had Emperor Xuanzong issue repeated edicts ordering Geshu to engage Cui. Geshu was forced to do so, and once he engaged Cui's troops, he fell into a trap that Cui had set, and most of the Tang army was wiped out. Geshu was only able to gather 8,000 soldiers to return to Tong Pass. He prepared to defend it anyway, but his subordinate Huoba Guiren, believing the situation to be hopeless, tried to convince him to surrender to Cui, pointing out that he was putting himself in the same position as Gao Xianzhi. Despite Geshu's protestations that he would rather be like Gao than surrender, Huoba bound him to a horse and then took him to surrender to Cui.

== After capture by An Lushan ==
Cui Qianyou delivered Geshu Han and Huoba Guiren to Luoyang, which An Lushan had made the capital of his new state of Yan after claiming imperial title. An executed Huoba for his treacherousness, and asked Geshu how he felt now, after having slighted An for years. Geshu responded that he simply had not see An's greatness at that time, and offered to write letters to Li Guangbi, Lai Tian, and Lu Gui, to ask them to surrender to An. An was pleased, and gave Geshu the honorable titles of Sikong (司空, one of the Three Excellencies) and Tong Zhongshu Menxia Pingzhangshi. Soon, however, those subordinates to whom Geshu wrote replied, rebuking him for his failure to die for Tang. An realized that Geshu was of no use to him, and put him under arrest.

In spring 757, An Lushan was assassinated by his son An Qingxu, who took the throne subsequently. Geshu remained under arrest. In winter 757, when Tang forces under Li Chu the Prince of Guangping and allied Huihe forces were arriving at Luoyang, An Qingxu decided to abandon Luoyang, and, as he did so, executed Geshu, Cheng Qianli (程千里), and 30 some other captured Tang generals. Geshu's son Geshu Yao (哥舒曜) was then a Tang general, and possibly because of this, Emperor Xuanzong's son and successor Emperor Suzong posthumously honored Geshu Han despite his having submitted to An Lushan, and gave him the posthumous name of Wumin (literally, "martial and suffering").

== See also ==
- Turks in the Tang military
