= An Lushan =

Rebel general in Tang China (703–757)

An Lushan 安禄山
- Emperor of Yan
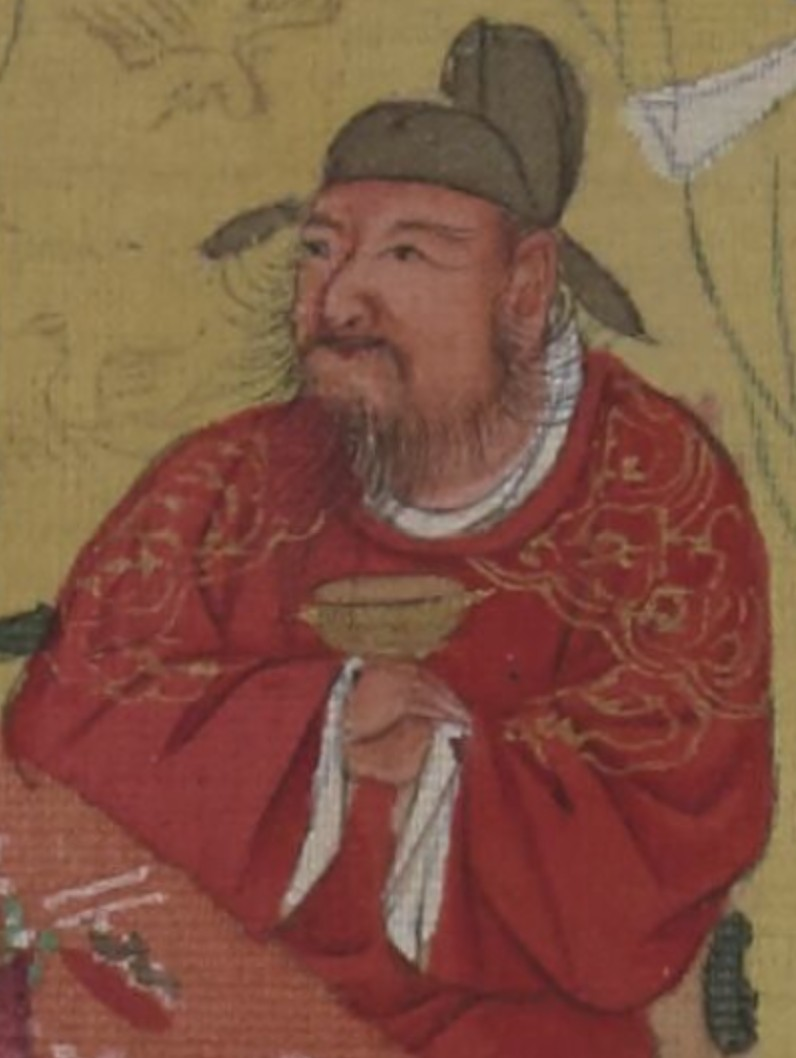

Emperor of the Yan dynasty
- Reign: 5 February 756 – 25 January 757
- Predecessor: None
- Successor: An Qingxu
- Born: 20th day of the 1st month (19 February), c. 703
- Died: 25 January 757 (aged 54)
- Spouse: Lady Kang (Empress Ai); Empress Duan
- Issue: An Qingzong; An Qingxu; An Qingzhang; An Qinghe, Prince of Zheng; An Qing'en six other sons
Names
- Family name: Possibly originally Kāng (康), Later Ān (安); Given name: Originally ܪܘܚܫܐܢ Roχšan, "The Luminous", in Sogdian; or, Āluòshān (阿犖山), Yàluòshān (軋犖山), or, later, Lùshān (祿山), in Chinese transcription.
Era dates
- Shèngwǔ (聖武)
Regnal name
- Emperor Xiongwu (雄武皇帝)
Posthumous name
- Emperor Guanglie (光烈皇帝)
Temple name
- None
- House: Yan
- Mother: Lady Ashide

An Lushan (Chinese: 安祿山; pinyin: Ān Lùshān; 20th day of the 1st month (19 February) 703 – 29 January 757) was a Turkic-Chinese military general and rebel leader during the Tang dynasty and is primarily known for instigating the An Lushan rebellion which devastated China and killed millions of Han Chinese. The rebellion caused the decline of the Tang dynasty and led to the sacking of Chang'an by the Tibetan Empire.

An Lushan was born to a Sogdian father and Turkic mother, at least by adoption. He rose to prominence as a general by defending the northeastern Tang frontier from the Khitans and other threats. Through his frequent visits to Chang'an, the Tang capital, An Lushan managed to gain favour with Emperor Xuanzong of Tang and Chancellor Li Linfu. By 751, he had been appointed military governor over three prefectures. After the death of Li Linfu in 753, An Lushan's rivalry with General Geshu Han and Chancellor Yang Guozhong created military tensions within the empire.

In late 755, An Lushan instigated open revolt and quickly captured Luoyang, the eastern capital, where in early 756 he proclaimed himself emperor of the new Yan dynasty. While his generals continued his campaigns, An Lushan remained in the Luoyang palace; his health failed and he became increasingly violent and paranoid. In early 757 he was murdered by a eunuch with the support of his son, An Qingxu.

== Background and name ==
An Lushan's mother was a Göktürk of the Ashide clan and served as a sorceress. According to historical sources, his original name might have been Aluoshan or Yaluoshan, the latter stated in the Old Book of Tang to mean "war" in Old Turkic. His father died early, and his mother Lady Ashide married a Turkic general An Yanyan (安延偃), who was a brother of general An Bozhi (安波至). An Lushan, therefore, took the surname An. Early in Emperor Xuanzong of Tang's Kaiyuan era, 713–741, there was a disturbance among the Göktürk tribe that An Yanyan belonged to, and he fled to Tang with his stepson An Lushan and nephew An Sishun. An Lushan later settled in Ying Prefecture (營州, roughly modern Chaoyang, Liaoning).

=== Paternity ===
Sources conflict about An Lushan's biological father's origin and surname; for example, whether An Lushan's father had the surname Kang or not: he took the name of An from his Göktürk stepfather An Yanyan. The surnames Kang and An suggest that they were respectively from the Sogdian kingdoms of Samarkand (康國; cf. Kangju) and Bukhara (安國). The An are not to be confused with Anxi, which had been established as a prefecture by the Chinese in 661.

On his side, Matsui Hitoshi, noting that nothing in the historical records provides hard evidence of Sogdian origin and that An Lushan was living at Yingzhou, a settlement of Kumo Xi and Khitan people, suggests that "Perhaps [An Lushan's father] might have been of Khitan origin." Edward H. Schafer, however, maintains that An Lushan is probably the Sinicized version of a name derived from Anxi (安息 "Parthia(n)") and the common Sogdian name ܪܘܚܫܐܢ Roxshan "the Bright" related to the Sogdian female name Roxana, also borne by Alexander's Sogdian wife, Roxana. His name has also been transcribed as Āluòshān (阿犖山) or Yàluòshān (軋犖山), and he was posthumously named Prince La of Yan (燕剌王) by his deputy Shi Siming.

== Youth ==
It was said that An Lushan knew six non-Chinese languages, and, after he grew older, served as an interpreter in one of the military markets, which were set up by the Chinese government largely to obtain horses in exchange for silk through foreign trade. Serving with him was Shi Sugan (later named Shi Siming), who was one day older than he was and who became a good friend of his. In 732, when the general Zhang Shougui (張守珪) was governing You Prefecture (幽州, roughly modern Beijing), it was discovered that An Lushan had stolen sheep. Zhang was set to execute An Lushan by caning, when An Lushan yelled out, "Is it that you, Lord, do not wish to destroy the two barbarian tribes? Why do you want to cane An Lushan to death?" Zhang, seeing that he had a large body and impressed by his plea, released him and had him serve as a police officer, along with Shi, and both of them were said to be capable at catching criminals. Later, Zhang promoted him to be a military officer. As Zhang believed that he was obese, he did not dare to eat too much while in Zhang's presence, and this drew Zhang's favor. Zhang took him in and treated him like a son. At a time that was not recorded in history, he married a Lady Kang as his first wife; they had at least one son, An Qingxu, who, however, was not his oldest son.

== Service in Tang armies ==
=== Rise through the ranks (736–742) ===
The Tang dynasty territory and provinces in 742, together with the approximate locations of the Khitan and Xi areas.

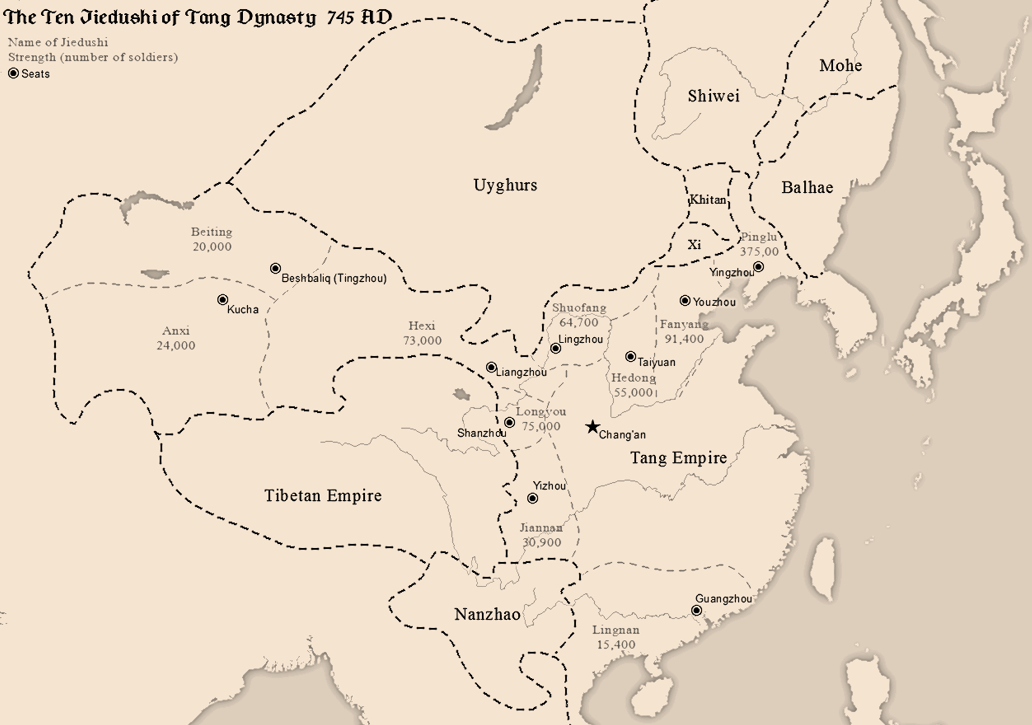
Distribution of 10 major jiedushi before the An Lushan rebellion; Hedong, Fanyang and Pinglu jiedushi were controlled by An Lushan

By 736, An Lushan carried a general title and was serving under Zhang Shougui as an officer of the Pinglu Army (平盧軍, based in modern Chaoyang). In 736, after An disobeyed Zhang's orders and made an overly aggressive attack against the Khitan and the Xi, he was defeated. According to army regulations, he was supposed to be executed. Zhang then sent him to the capital, Chang'an; by not executing An himself, Zhang was hoping that Emperor Xuanzong would pardon An. The chancellor Zhang Jiuling, arguing that An's death would be necessary to preserve military discipline and further believing that An had the appearance of a rebel, advocated An's death, but Emperor Xuanzong believed An to be able and did not want to execute him, and therefore spared him but stripped him of titles, returning him to serve under Zhang.

In 740, An became the Bingmashi (兵馬使) of Pinglu Army. In 741, when the deputy chief imperial censor Zhang Lizhen (張利貞) was sent to survey the Hebei (河北, i.e., the region north of the Yellow River) and visited Pinglu Army, An ingratiated himself with Zhang, so much so that he even bribed Zhang's servants. When Zhang returned to Chang'an and praised An, Emperor Xuanzong promoted An to be the commandant at Ying Prefecture and the commander of Pinglu Army, to defend against the Khitan, the Xi, Balhae, and the Heishui Mohe. In 742, Xuanzong further promoted Pinglu Army to be a military circuit, making An its military governor (jiedushi).

=== At Chang'an (743) ===
In 743, An visited Chang'an to pay homage to Emperor Xuanzong. Emperor Xuanzong treated him well and allowed him to visit the palace at all times. He began to inject himself into court politics—as the official Su Xiaoyun (蘇孝韞) complained to him that the imperial examinations that year was unfair and that Zhang Shi (張奭), the son of the deputy chief imperial censor Zhang Yi (張倚), had been given top grade despite having no abilities. An reported this to Emperor Xuanzong, who ordered a retesting before him personally. Zhang Shi was not able to even write one character in response to Emperor Xuanzong's reexamination. As a result, the deputy ministers of civil service, Song Yao (宋遙) and Miao Jinqing were demoted.

An often pleased Emperor Xuanzong by offering Emperor Xuanzong tributes of rare items, such as rare animals or jewels. By this time, he was even more obese than before, and Emperor Xuanzong, on one occasion, jokingly asked him, "What does this barbaric belly contain?" He responded, "Other than a faithful heart, there is nothing else." On another occasion, when Emperor Xuanzong's son Li Heng the Crown Prince was in audience, he refused to bow to Li Heng, stating, "I am a barbarian, and I do not understand formal ceremony. What is a crown prince?" Emperor Xuanzong responded, "He is the reserve emperor. After my death, he will be your emperor." An apologized, stating, "I am foolish. I had only known about Your Imperial Majesty, and not that there is such a thing as a reserve emperor." He bowed, but Emperor Xuanzong, believing him to be honest, favored him even more. As he was allowed to enter the palace, he asked that he become an adoptive son of Emperor Xuanzong's favorite concubine Consort Yang Guifei, and Emperor Xuanzong agreed. Thereafter, on one occasion, he bowed to Consort Yang first before bowing to Emperor Xuanzong, stating, "Barbarians bow to mothers first before fathers." Xuanzong, now believing An was as submissive to him as a son to a father, showed him even greater favors.

=== Return to the north front ===
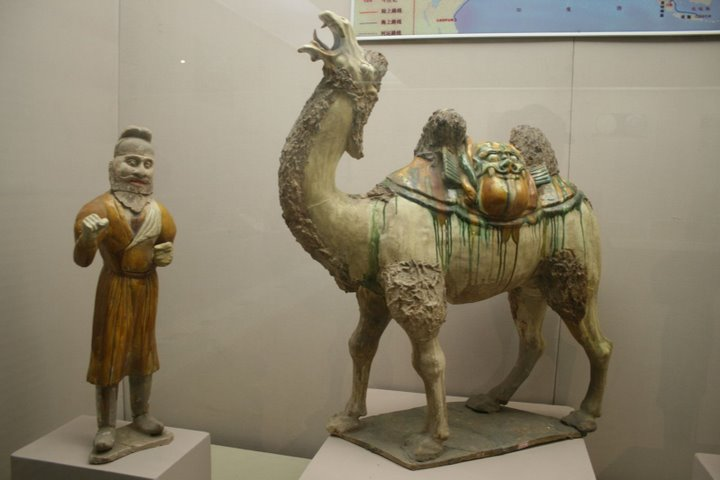
A Tang Chinese ceramic statuette of a Sogdian merchant and a camel

In 744, with further praises from the powerful chancellor Li Linfu and Pei Kuan, An was, in addition to Pinglu, made the military governor of Fanyang Circuit (范陽, headquartered in modern Beijing). Wanting to show his military abilities, he often pillaged the Khitan and the Xi. His actions led to two princesses of the royal clan, who were married to Khitan and Xi leaders as part of the heqin policy, being executed in retaliation, and both groups rebelled in 745, though An defeated them.

According to the Song dynasty historian Sima Guang, it was said that An was attempting to increase his own strength and planning a rebellion, and in 747, he claimed to be building Fort Xiongwu (雄武城) and asked fellow military governor Wang Zhongsi to contribute troops, hoping to hold onto the troops that Wang would send and not return them. Wang, instead, led the troops himself to Xiongwu in advance of the rendezvous date and, after participating in the building project, returned with the soldiers, and submitted reports to Emperor Xuanzong that he believed An was planning treason. Li Linfu, who was at this point apprehensive of Wang as a potential rival, used this as one of the reasons to indict Wang, and Wang was, later in 747, removed from his post. Also in 747, An Lushan was given the honorary title as chief deputy imperial censor (御史大夫, Yùshǐ Dàfū), and Lady Duan, now described as his wife, although Lady Kang was still alive, was created a lady.

In 748, Emperor Xuanzong awarded An Lushan an iron certificate promising that he would not be executed, except for treason, and in 750, he created A Prince of Dongping, setting a precedent for generals not of the imperial Li clan to be created princes.

=== New period in Chang'an ===
By this point, a friendship had developed between An Lushan and the Emperor. When An went to Chang'an later that year to pay homage to Emperor Xuanzong, he presented Emperor Xuanzong with 8,000 Xi captives. In 751, Xuanzong had a magnificent mansion built for An in Chang'an, sparing no expense, using jade, gold, and silver in many different places. On An's birthday, 20 February 751, Emperor Xuanzong and Consort Yang awarded him with clothing, treasures, and food. On 23 February, when An was summoned to the palace, Consort Yang, in order to please Emperor Xuanzong, had an extra-large infant wrapping made, and wrapped An in it, causing much explosion of laughter among the ladies-in-waiting and eunuchs. When Emperor Xuanzong asked what was going on, Consort Yang's attendants joked that Consort Yang gave birth three days ago and was washing her baby Lushan. Emperor Xuanzong was pleased by the comical situation and rewarded both Consort Yang and An greatly. Thereafter, whenever An visited the capital, he was allowed free admittance to the palace, and there were rumors that he and Consort Yang had an affair, but Emperor Xuanzong discounted the rumors. At An's request, Emperor Xuanzong also gave him the governorship of Hedong Circuit (河東, headquartered in modern Taiyuan, Shanxi), in addition to Pinglu and Fanyang. Two of his sons, An Qingzong and An Qingxu, were given ministerial level positions, and An Qingzong was given an imperial clan member's daughter, the Lady Rongyi, in marriage.

An was arrogant toward other officials, including Consort Yang's second cousin Yang Guozhong. However, carrying the honorary title of deputy chief imperial censor (御史大夫) at this point, he was respectful of his colleague Wang Hong (王鉷), an associate of Li Linfu's, although initially not Li Linfu—and therefore, on one occasion, Li Linfu intentionally summoned Wang Hong in An's presence, and when Wang Hong arrived, he was paying Li Linfu great respect, causing An to be surprised and apprehensive, and thereafter An carefully cultivated his relationship with Li Linfu as well.

=== Pondering Emperor Xuanzong's death & Northward campaign ===
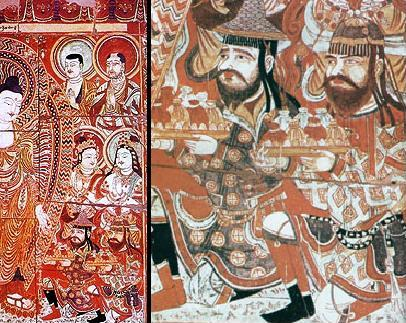
Sogdian merchants from a 9th-century Buddhist fresco in Bezeklik, Xinjiang

It was also said that, by this point, An began to be apprehensive of what would happen once Emperor Xuanzong died—as he remembered how he had refused to bow to Li Heng—and he began to plan an eventual rebellion, which was further encouraged by his observation that the heart of the empire was without defenses. He selected some 8,000 soldiers among the surrendered Khitan, Xi, and Tongluo (同羅) tribesmen, organizing them into an elite corps known as the Yeluohe (曵落河), which meant "the brave". He retained Gao Shang (高尚), Yan Zhuang (嚴莊), Zhang Tongru (張通儒), and Sun Xiaozhe (孫孝哲) as his strategists; and Shi Siming, An Shouzhong (安守忠), Li Guiren (李歸仁), Cai Xide (蔡希德), Niu Tingjie (牛廷玠), Xiang Runrong (向潤容), Li Tingwang (李庭望), Cui Qianyou (崔乾祐), Yin Ziqi (尹子奇), He Qiannian (何千年), Wu Lingxun (武令珣), Neng Yuanhao (能元皓), Tian Chengsi, Tian Qianzhen (田乾真), and Ashina Chengqing (阿史那承慶) as his generals.

Late in 751, An launched a major attack against the Khitan, advancing quickly to the heart of Khitan territory, but, hampered by rains, was defeated by the Khitan, and the general He Side (何思德) was killed. An himself was almost killed, and, after retreating, blamed the defeat on Ge Jie (哥解) and Yu Chengxian (魚承仙), executing them. He subsequently had Shi defend against the Khitan counterattack, and Shi was able to repel the Khitan. In 752, he wanted to launch a major counterattack against the Khitan, requesting that the ethnically Tujue general Li Xianzhong (李獻忠) accompany him. Li Xianzhong was afraid of An; when An ordered Li to attack the Khitan, Li rebelled, thus putting a halt to An's campaign.

=== Rivalry with Geshu Han ===
Later that year, when Emperor Xuanzong, seeing that both An Lushan and An Sishun (who by this point was the military governor of Shuofang Circuit (朔方, headquartered in modern Yinchuan, Ningxia)) had poor relations with Geshu Han, the military governor of Hexi (河西, headquartered in modern Wuwei, Gansu) and Longxi (隴西, headquartered in modern Haidong prefecture, Qinghai) Circuits, and wanted to improve relations between these three key border troop commanders, he summoned all three to the capital and had the powerful eunuch Gao Lishi host a feast for the three of them, trying to get them to resolve their unpleasantries. At the conference, however, Geshu and An Lushan got into an argument, which only stopped after Gao gazed at Geshu, stopping him from responding to An Lushan's insults.

=== Death of Li Linfu and rivalry with Yang Guozhong ===
In 753, with Li Linfu's death and replacement by Yang Guozhong, Yang Guozhong, intending to posthumously dishonor Li Linfu, had An Lushan corroborate his accusations that Li Linfu was involved in Li Xianzhong's rebellion. An agreed, and subsequently, with further corroboration from Li Linfu's son-in-law Yang Qixuan (楊齊宣), Li Linfu was posthumously dishonored, and his family members were exiled. Also in 753, Li Xianzhong's troops were defeated by the Uyghur Khaganate, and they surrendered to An, further enhancing his strength.

Despite their cooperation posthumously accusing Li Linfu, a rivalry soon developed between An and Yang Guozhong, as An did not fear Yang Guozhong the way he did Li Linfu. Yang Guozhong made repeated accusations against An to Emperor Xuanzong that he was plotting a rebellion, but Emperor Xuanzong dismissed the accusations. Yang Guozhong, instead, allied with Geshu against An. In spring 754, Yang asserted to the Emperor that An was set on rebelling, an accusation Yang had made before. Yang predicted that if Emperor Xuanzong summoned An to Chang'an, he would surely not come. However, when Emperor Xuanzong tested Yang's hypothesis by summoning An, he immediately appeared in Chang'an and claimed Yang was making false accusations. After that, Emperor Xuanzong refused to believe any suggestions that An was plotting rebellion despite Li Heng agreeing with Yang's assessment on this issue. The Emperor even considered promoting An to be chancellor; however, Yang opposed this, and the promotion did not occur. An returned to Fanyang. At An's request, Emperor Xuanzong allowed him to award his soldiers high ranks without first receiving imperial approval. (Geshu, hearing this, made the same request, and Emperor Xuanzong granted this privilege to Geshu.) Later, in 754, An defeated Xi forces, capturing their chieftain Li Riyue (李日越). Meanwhile, Yang Guozhong viewed the official Wei Zhi (韋陟) as a threat and accused Wei of corruption. Yang Guozhong later accused Wei of bribing An's associate Ji Wen (吉溫), and Wei and Ji were both demoted. An submitted a petition on their behalf, claiming that the accusations from Yang Guozhong were false. Emperor Xuanzong took no actions against either An or Yang Guozhong.

== Rebellion ==
The An Lushan Rebellion spanned from 16 December 755 to 17 February 763. This rebellion appears to have involved the death of some 13 million people, which would make it one of the deadliest wars in history. Many scholars attribute the loss of 36 million people in the Tang census after the rebellion to a breakdown in Tang taxation and census gathering.

=== Initial stage ===
In the spring of 755, matters were coming to a head. An Lushan submitted a petition to Emperor Xuanzong to replace 32 Han generals under his command with non-Han generals. Xuanzong accepted An's request despite opposition from chancellors Yang Guozhong and Wei Jiansu, who took An's request as a sign of impending rebellion. Yang and Wei then suggested that An be promoted chancellor, and that his three commands be divided between his three deputies.

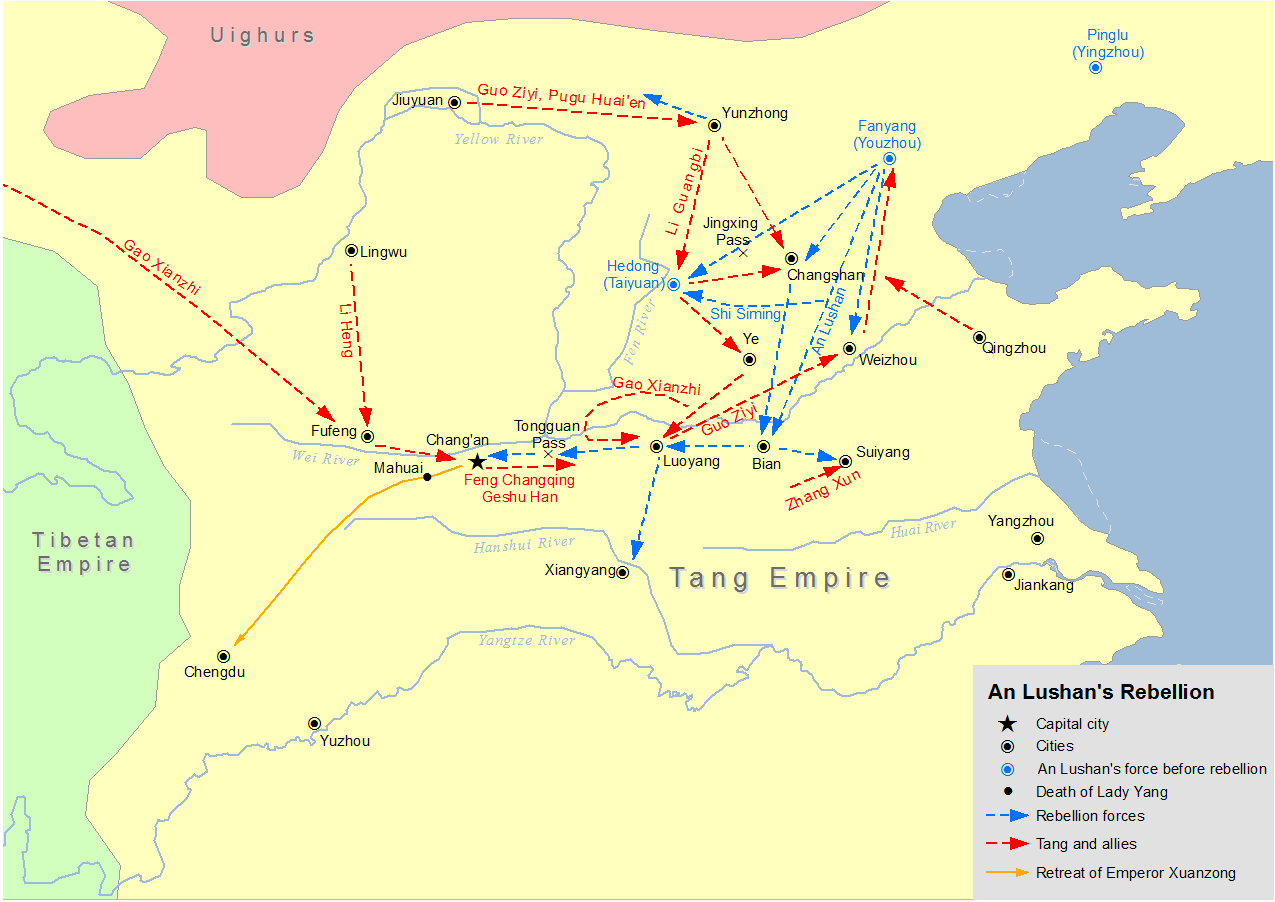
Map of An Lushan Rebellion

Emperor Xuanzong initially agreed, but after the edict was drafted, Xuanzong delayed and instead sent the eunuch Fu Qiulin (輔璆琳) to send fresh fruits to An and to observe him—upon which An was alleged to have bribed Fu into submitting a favorable report. Yang, however, persisted in his reports against An. Yang then attacked some of An's staff and associates, including having the mayor of Jingzhao arrest An's friend Li Chao (李超) and others, and executing them secretly. An Qingzong, who was then at Chang'an, reported Yang's attack to An Lushan, causing considerable concern to An Lushan, who, thereafter, refused to attend the funeral of an imperial prince in summer 755, and did not offer to send a large number of horses to Chang'an that autumn, which aroused the suspicions of Emperor Xuanzong. Allegations of An's bribes to Fu also reached the Emperor, who then had Fu executed, and sent another eunuch, Feng Shenwei (馮神威) to Fanyang to again summon An Lushan, who ignored the summons.

In winter 755, An launched his rebellion on 16 December, claiming he had received a secret edict from Emperor Xuanzong to advance on Chang'an to remove Yang. The imperial officials were all apprehensive, because An had the strongest troops of the realm at the time, except for Yang, who believed that An could be suppressed easily. Emperor Xuanzong commissioned the general Feng Changqing as military governor of Fanyang and Pinglu, intending to have him replace An after An's rebellion was defeated. The Emperor also sent Feng to the eastern capital, Luoyang, to build up the defense there; another general, Gao Xianzhi, was ordered to command a secondary defense at Shan Commandery (陝郡, roughly modern Sanmenxia, Henan). He executed An Qingzong and An's first wife Lady Kang, and forced An Qingzong's present wife, Lady Rongyi, to take her own life.

On 8 January 756, An Lushan crossed the Yellow River, quickly capturing Chenliu (陳留, roughly modern Kaifeng, Henan) and Yingyang (滎陽, roughly modern Zhengzhou, Henan) Commanderies. He approached Luoyang, where he encountered an ill-prepared army commanded by Feng, defeating Feng quickly and forcing Feng to flee and concede Luoyang to him. Feng joined forces with Gao and urged a retreat to Tong Pass; Gao agreed, and they took up defensive positions there, and An did not proceed quickly, but remained at Luoyang, planning to declare himself emperor there. (Soon, due to accusations of the eunuch Bian Lingcheng (邊令誠), Emperor Xuanzong executed Feng and Gao, and replaced Gao with Geshu Han.) Some Tang officials north of the Yellow River resisted An Lushan under the leadership of Yan Zhenqing, the governor of Pingyuan Commandery (平原, roughly modern Dezhou, Shandong).

=== As emperor of Yan ===
On Lunar New Year's day, 756 (5 February), An Lushan declared himself Emperor at Luoyang, establishing a new state of Yan, making Zhang Tongru and the surrendered Tang official Daxi Xun (達奚珣) his chancellors. He created An Qingxu the Prince of Jin and another son, An Qinghe (安慶和), the Prince of Zheng. Meanwhile, Yan Zhenqing's cousin Yan Gaoqing (顏杲卿), who initially submitted to An, rose against An at Changshan Commandery (常山, roughly modern Baoding, Hebei) but was quickly defeated and delivered to An in Luoyang; An executed him and sent An Qingxu to make an initial attack against Tong Pass, and Geshu Han repelled the attack.

By this time, the Tang generals Guo Ziyi and Li Guangbi had fought their way into Emperor An's territory north of the Yellow River, cutting off the communication between Luoyang and Fanyang, causing much fear in An's troops. An considered withdrawing north of the Yellow River to secure the territory, but meanwhile, suspicions had begun to rise between Yang Guozhong and Geshu, each believing that the other had designs on himself. Yang therefore persuaded Emperor Xuanzong to order Geshu to attack the Yan general Cui Qianyou, who was then stationed at Shan Commandery. (This order was against the advice of Geshu, Guo, and Li Guangbi that the proper strategy was to secure Tong Pass and let Guo and Li Guangbi capture the Yan territory to the north.) Geshu, with Emperor Xuanzong repeatedly ordering him to attack, was forced to do so, and was defeated by Cui. Geshu's subordinate Huoba Guiren (火拔歸仁) seized him and surrendered to Yan forces. Subsequently, An induced Geshu to write letters to several Tang generals, urging them to surrender, but they all refused.

When Yan forces captured Tong Pass, Emperor Xuanzong and Yang, in panic, abandoned Chang'an and fled toward Shu Commandery (蜀郡, roughly modern Chengdu, Sichuan). On the way, at a small village, Mawei Station, prompted by general Chen Xuanli who believed that Yang Guozhong had provoked this rebellion, the imperial guards assassinated Yang Guozhong, and demanded the death of Yang Guifei, to which the Emperor reluctantly consented. An, caught by surprise of the Emperor's retreat, had Cui advance slowly into Chang'an, even though the Tang mayor of Chang'an, Cui Guangyuan (崔光遠), offered to surrender. Also surrendering to Yan forces were the former chancellor Chen Xilie and the key officials Zhang Jun (張均) and Zhang Ji (張垍), and An made Chen and Zhang Ji chancellors as well.

Meanwhile, An had Emperor Xuanzong's sister, Princess of Huo, as well as a number of other imperial relatives, executed, and sacrificed their organs to An Qingzong. At this point, there was a new Tang Emperor: Li Heng, or Emperor Suzong. Due to the slowness of the Yan advance, the Yan forces were unable to capture either Emperor Xuanzong, who eventually reached Shu Commandery, or Li Heng, who fled to Lingwu and took the Tang imperial title there (as Emperor Suzong). (Xuanzong recognized Li Heng's actions and subsequently took the title Taishang Huang (retired emperor).) Hearing news of Chang'an's fall, Guo and Li Guangbi withdrew to Lingwu, allowing Shi to again pacify the region north of the Yellow River and east of the Taihang Mountains with exception of pockets held by Yan Zhenqing and other Tang officials under his command.

=== Death ===
Once he had assumed the imperial title, An Lushan spent most of his time inside the Luoyang palace. His generals rarely saw him, and most important matters were handled through Yan Zhuang (嚴莊).

An Lushan suffered from chronic eye problems that eventually led to blindness; he had ulcers; and he was extremely obese. His sheer weight once crushed to death a horse and he needed three servants to help him to put on and take off his clothes when he visited Huaqing Pool.

An Lushan had a highly-trusted Khitan eunuch named Li Zhu'er (李豬兒). But in his sickness and blindness An became ill-tempered and paranoid, and would flog or even murder his servants if they had caused him any displeasure. Even Yan Zhuang and Li Zhu'er were said to be hit frequently.

An Lushan favored his son An Qing'en (安慶恩) (the son of his second wife, Lady Duan) and was considering appointing An Qing'en to be crown prince (instead of An Qingxu, who otherwise was in line to receive that title). Knowing that he was out of favor, and fearing that An Lushan was planning to kill him, An Qingxu, along with He, Yan, and Li Zhu'er, decided to assassinate An Lushan.

On the night of 29 January 757, with Yan and An Qingxu watching outside, Li Zhu'er took a sword into the palace and attacked An Lushan. An tried to fight back, but could not locate a sword that he had put under his bed. Li Zhu'er attacked his stomach and abdomen. As his intestines were coming out of his body, An screamed "this is a thief of my own household" and died.

The next morning, Yan announced to the Yan officials that An Lushan was seriously ill, and that he had appointed An Qingxu crown prince. Then, after taking the throne, An Qingxu reported that An Lushan had died.

Two years later, in 759, after Shi Siming killed An Qingxu and assumed the imperial title, Shi Siming buried An Lushan with the ceremony due an imperial prince, not an emperor, and gave him the rather unflattering posthumous name of La (剌).

An Lushan's military promotions
Date	Office (pinyin + English)	Mission
pre-740	officer of the Pinglu Army 平盧軍, translator	
741, seventh month	Governor-general of Yingzhou and Pinglu Jun Bingma Shi (兵馬使, commander of the Pinglu army)	taking charge of the affairs of the northeastern frontier and overseeing the Khitan, Xi, Balhae, etc.
742, first month	Pinglu Jiedu Shi (Regional commander of Pinglu)	for pacifying the Shiwei and Mohe.
744, third month	Fanyang Jiedu Shi (Regional commander of Fanyang)	for controlling the Khitan and Xi and surrounding area.
747	Yushi Daifu (御史大夫, chief deputy imperial censor)	honorary title
751, second month	Hedong Jiedu Shi (Regional commander of Hedong)	for defending the Turks.
755	Yan Huangdi (Emperor Yan, death in 757)	Try to overthrow the Tang dynasty and install his own.
Sources : Xu Elina-Qian, pp. 248–249

== Personal information ==
- Father
  - may be surnamed Kang (康) (personal name unknown)
- Mother
  - Lady Ashide
- Stepfather
  - An Yanyan (安延偃)
- Wives
  - Lady Kang, mother of Prince Qingxu (executed by Emperor Xuanzong of Tang 756)
  - Empress Duan, mother of An Qing'en
- Children
  - An Qingzong (安慶宗) (executed by Emperor Xuanzong of Tang 756)
  - An Qingxu (安慶緒), the Prince of Jin (created 756), later emperor
  - An Qingzhang (安慶長)
  - An Qinghe (安慶和), the Prince of Zheng (created 756, executed by Emperor Suzong of Tang 758)
  - An Qing'en (安慶恩)
  - Six other sons, names unrecorded in history
- Other
  - An Sishun (relationship uncertain)

== Popular culture ==
- Portrayed by So Yamamura in the 1955 Japanese film Princess Yang Kwei Fei
- Portrayed by Wong Chun in TVB's 1997 Hong Kong television series The Hitman Chronicles
- Portrayed by Louis Yuen in the 2000 Hong Kong television series The Legend of Lady Yang
- Portrayed by Lam Suet in 2017 Chinese television series The Glory of Tang Dynasty

== Notes ==
Chinese royalty
New dynasty	Emperor of Yan (An–Shi); 756–757	Succeeded by An Qingxu
Preceded by Emperor Xuanzong of Tang	de facto ruler of North China; 756–757	Succeeded by An Qingxu
