= Three Fanzhen of Hebei =

Powerful regions in late Tang China

The Three Fanzhen of Hebei (Chinese: 河朔三镇; pinyin: Hé shuò sān zhèn) were three regions in what is now Hebei, China governed by powerful jiedushi in the post-An Lushan Rebellion (755-763) Tang dynasty (618–907). After the rebellion, the three regions of Chéngdé (成德), Lúlóng (盧龍) and Wèibó (魏博) were controlled by ex-rebel generals who held substantial territory and forces. Although nominally under the authority of the Tang dynasty, they were functionally independent fanzhen that continued to the end of the Tang dynasty. In the south, however, the court took a much more aggressive stand against such defense commands as Zīqīng (淄青) (mainly in Shandong), Biànsòng (汴宋) (in east Henan), and Huáixī (淮西) (in south Henan), which posed a more immediate and palpable threat to the transportation of strategic grains through the Grand Canal, on which the court depended.

During Emperor Xianzong's reign the northeast region was briefly subdued, but after his death it became independent again. By the reign of Emperor Wenzong, the central government had lost all control over this region. The situation was summed up thus by Tang dynasty's chancellor Niu Sengru:

"Ever since the Anshi Rebellion, the three Fanzhen have not been part of the country. Although Liu Zong briefly gave the area to the central government, in the end it became independent and 80 million strings of cash were wasted. These regions are fought over frequently; one day Zhicheng has it, the next day Zaiyi. As long as the jiedushi can fend off the northern barbarians, we will not care about its allegiance."

== See also ==
- Fanzhen
- Five Dynasties and Ten Kingdoms period
- Jiedushi

== Sources ==
- Old Book of Tang
