= Empress Duan (An Lushan's wife) =

Empress Duan (段皇后, personal name unknown) was the second wife of An Lushan, a general of the Chinese Tang dynasty and later emperor of his rebel state of Yan. After he declared himself emperor of Yan in 756, she probably carried the title of empress, but historical records are not completely clear.

Little historical records exist about her. She was already considered An Lushan's wife in 747, even though his first wife Lady Kang was still alive. In 747, when Emperor Xuanzong of Tang gave An the honorary title as chief imperial censor, she was created a lady, with a rank rivaling the sisters of Emperor Xuanzong's favorite concubine Consort Yang Yuhuan. She had at least one son with him, An Qing'en (安慶恩), who was not one of three oldest of his 11 sons but whose birth rank is otherwise unknown.

In 755, An Lushan rebelled against Emperor Xuanzong's reign at Fanyang (范陽, in modern Beijing) and quickly advanced south, capturing the Tang eastern capital Luoyang later in the year. In spring 756, he declared himself emperor of new state of Yan. Historical records, however, did not explicitly state that she was created empress at that time. In response to An's rebellion, Emperor Xuanzong executed his first wife Lady Kang and oldest son An Qingzong (安慶宗), both of whom were then at the Tang capital Chang'an. Lady Kang's son An Qingxu was the second oldest son, but was not favored by An Lushan. Instead, An Lushan favored both Lady Duan and her son An Qing'en and was considering creating An Qing'en crown prince. By spring 757, An Lushan was severely ill and blind. He was also ill-tempered, and his attendants, as well as An Qingxu, all feared death. An Qingxu therefore entered into a conspiracy with the high-level official Yan Zhuang (嚴莊) and An Lushan's eunuch Li Zhu'er (李豬兒), and they assassinated An Lushan. An Qingxu succeeded to the Yan throne. No further reference was made to Empress Duan after that point.

== Notes and references ==
Chinese royalty
New dynasty	Empress of Yan (Anshi); 756 – 757	Succeeded by Empress Xin
Preceded by Empress Wang of Tang dynasty	Empress of China (Northern/Central); 756 – 757	Succeeded by Empress Xin
