= An Qingxu =

8th-century Chinese nobility

An Qingxu 安慶緒

Emperor of the Yan dynasty
- Reign: 30 January 757 – 10 April 759
- Predecessor: An Lushan
- Successor: Shi Siming
- Born: 730s
- Died: 10 April 759
Full name
- Family name: Ān (安); Given name: Originally Rénzhí (仁執), later Qìngxù (慶緒)
Era name and dates
- Tiānchéng (天成): 30 January 757 – 10 April 759
Posthumous name
- Prince La of Jin (晉剌王)
- Dynasty: Yan (燕)

An Qingxu (安慶緒) (730s – 10 April 759), né An Renzhi (安仁執), was the second emperor of the Yan state from 757 until his death in 759.

He was a son of An Lushan, a general of the Chinese Tang dynasty who rebelled and took the imperial title, and then established his own state of Yan. An Qingxu served as the Prince of Jin in 756–757, and later killed his father and took the imperial title for himself. He was eventually defeated by Tang forces and cornered at Yecheng in present-day Hebei. After An Lushan's general Shi Siming lifted the siege, An Qingxu met Shi to thank him, but Shi arrested and executed him.

== Under Tang rule ==
An Renzhi was physically strong and capable in mounted archery. It is not known when An was born, although he was said to be not yet 20 when Emperor Xuanzong gave him the mostly honorary title of minister of vassal affairs, likely in 751. He was An Lushan's second son, and his mother was An Lushan's first wife Lady Kang. At some point, Emperor Xuanzong gave him the name of Qingxu. The first definitive historical references to him were in 752, when, in a defeat that An Lushan suffered against the Xi, An Lushan was said to have fallen into a hole and was only saved through the effort of An Qingxu and others. Also that year, when An Lushan's close associate Ji Wen (吉溫) went to meet An Lushan before departing for the Tang capital Chang'an, it was An Qingxu that An Lushan sent to accompany Ji to the borders of his territory.

== Under An Lushan's rule ==
In 755, when An Lushan rebelled at his post at Fanyang Circuit (范陽, headquartered in modern Beijing), An Qingxu was apparently with his father and accompanied his father south. In response to An Lushan's rebellion, An Qingxu's mother Lady Kang and older brother An Qingzong (安慶宗), then at Chang'an, were executed, and after An Lushan captured Chenliu Commandery (陳留, roughly modern Kaifeng, Henan), it was An Qingxu who realized that An Qingzong had been executed and who tearfully informed his father, sending his father into a rage in which he executed the Tang soldiers who surrendered to him at Chenliu.

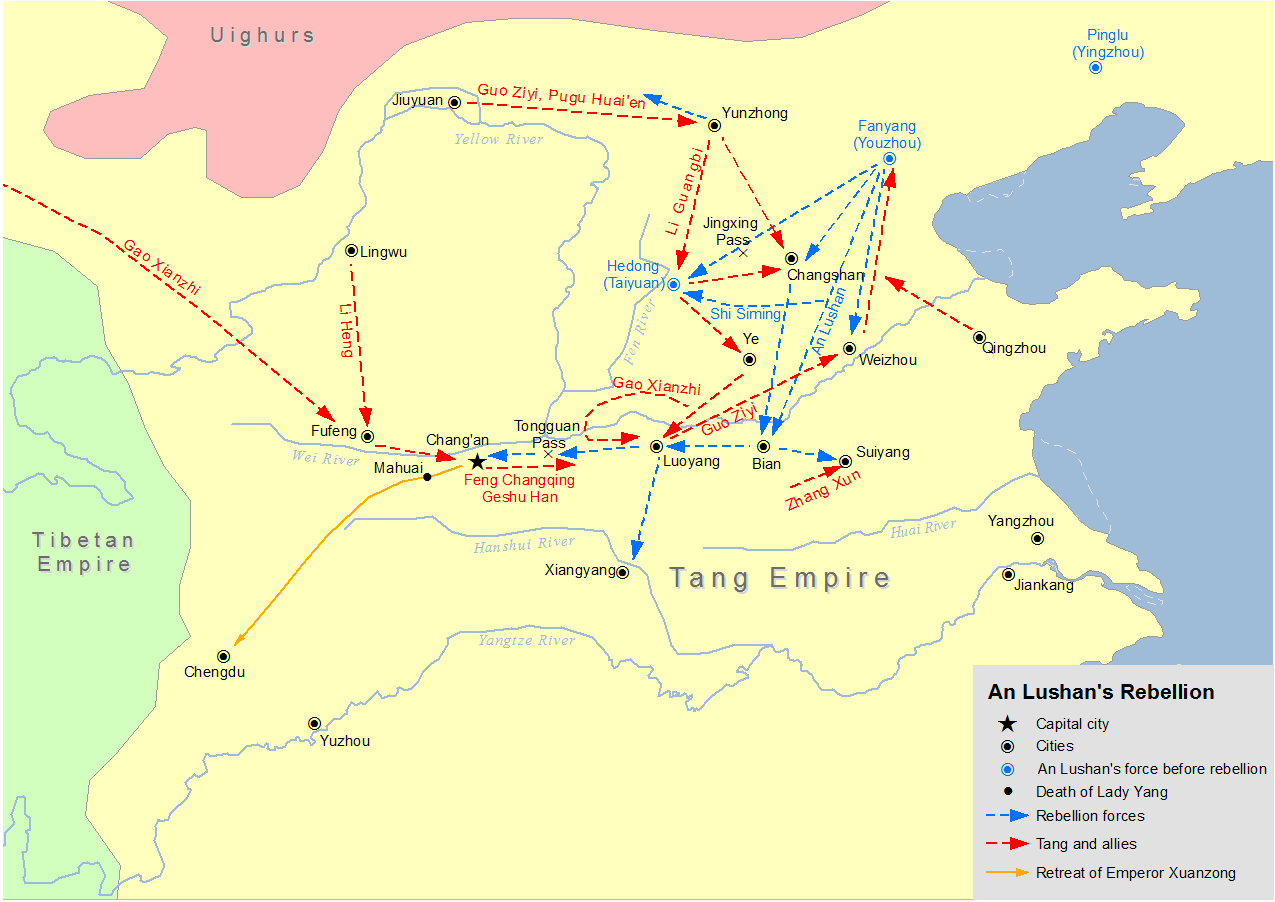
Map of An-Shi rebellion

In 756, after An Lushan declared himself emperor of a new state of Yan at Luoyang, he created An Qingxu the Prince of Jin. He subsequently sent An Qingxu to make a preliminary attack against Tong Pass, then defended by the Tang general Geshu Han, and Geshu repelled An Qingxu's attack.

By early 757, when Yan forces had captured Chang'an and forced both Emperor Xuanzong and his crown prince Li Heng to flee, it was said that An Lushan was having eye problems and had become blind, and was also suffering from ulcers on his body. As a result, his temper became terrible, and his servants, if they had caused him any ill will, would often be whipped or caned, and sometimes even executed. Once he declared imperial title, he spent most of his time inside the Luoyang palace, and his generals rarely saw him, with most important matters going through his official Yan Zhuang (嚴莊)—but even Yan and a favorite eunuch of An's, Li Zhu'er (李豬兒), were being frequently battered. Meanwhile, An Lushan favored another son An Qing'en (安慶恩), the son of his second wife Lady Duan (who might have carried the title of empress by this point). An considered letting An Qing'en be his crown prince, instead of An Qingxu, who was otherwise in line to receive that honor (as Qingxu was now Lushan's eldest surviving son; Lushan's eldest son Qingzong had already been executed in 756). An Qingxu often feared that An Lushan would put him to death. He, Yan, and Li Zhu'er therefore plotted. On the night of 29 January 757, with Yan and An Qingxu watching outside, Li Zhu'er took a sword into the palace and attacked An Lushan; An Lushan tried to fight back, but could not locate a sword that he usually put under his bed, and Li Zhu'er killed him. The next morning, Yan first announced to the Yan officials that An Lushan was seriously ill and was creating An Qingxu crown prince, and then An Qingxu took the throne, before announcing An Lushan's death.

== As emperor ==
It was said that An Qingxu was an introvert who couldn't speak to others properly. As a result, Yan Zhuang advised him not to meet officials frequently, and he entrusted most of affairs of state to Yan and created Yan the Prince of Fengyi. He tried to ingratiate his generals by promoting their positions. Meanwhile, with the major general Shi Siming besieging the Tang general Li Guangbi at Taiyuan, An Qingxu ordered Shi to return to his base of Fanyang and leave the general Cai Xide (蔡希德) at Taiyuan to watch Li Guangbi's actions. He also sent the general Yin Ziqi (尹子奇) to attack the city of Suiyang, then under the defense by the Tang generals Zhang Xun and Xu Yuan (許遠), intending to capture Suiyang first and then send Yin south to capture Tang territory south of the Huai River (Yin, however, was locked into a siege of Suiyang that would last until winter 757, stopping any possibility of Yan's advancing south). To show favor to Shi, he created Shi the Prince of Guichuan and made him the military governor (jiedushi) of Fanyang Circuit; instead, Shi, hoarding the supplies that An Lushan had previously shipped to Fanyang, began to disobey An Qingxu's orders, and An Qingxu could not keep him in check. When the Tang general Guo Ziyi attacked Tong Pass, intending to recapture Chang'an, however, An was able to send forces to repel Guo's attack.

However, the Tang prince Li Chu the Prince of Guangping (the son of Li Heng, who by this point had taken imperial title as Emperor Suzong), with aid from Huige, was able to recapture Chang'an in summer 757. Tang forces under Li Chu and Huige forces then advanced east, toward Luoyang. In winter 757, An put together his forces and sent them, under Yan Zhuang's command, to defend Shan Commandery (陝郡, roughly modern Sanmenxia, Henan). When Yan forces engaged Tang forces, however, they saw that Huige forces were on Tang's side, and, in fear, they collapsed. Yan Zhuang and Zhang Tongru (張通儒) fled back to Luoyang to inform An, and An, after executing some 30 Tang generals who had been captured, abandoned Luoyang and fled north, to Yecheng, which he converted to Ancheng Municipality.

At the time that An arrived at Yecheng, he had only 1,000 infantry soldiers and 300 cavalry soldiers. Soon, however, Yan generals Ashina Chengqing (阿史那承慶), Cai Xide, Tian Chengsi, and Wu Lingxun (武令珣), who had been attacking other Tang cities, headed to Yecheng and coalesced there, allowing An to have over 60,000 soldiers under his disposal and thus regaining some measure of strength. Meanwhile, apprehensive of Shi, he sent Ashina and An Shouzhong (安守忠) to Fanyang to order Shi to contribute troops, but was intending to have Ashina and An Shouzhong take over Shi's command if possible. Instead, Shi arrested Ashina and An Shouzhong and submitted to Tang. Many other cities previously under Yan's control also submitted to Tang, and An Qingxu's territory shrank to just Yecheng and the surrounding area. It was said that An Qingxu became cruel and paranoid in light of these military losses, and that if generals submitted to Tang, he would slaughter their families if they were Han and their tribes if they were non-Han. Meanwhile, believing accusations that Zhang made against Cai, he killed Cai, which further led to dissension among his soldiers, particularly since he then put Cui Qianyou (崔乾祐) in command of his army, and the soldiers resented Cui for his harshness.

By winter 758, the Tang generals Guo Ziyi, Lu Jiong (魯炅), Li Huan (李奐), Xu Shuji (許叔冀), Li Siye, Ji Guangchen (季廣琛), Cui Guangyuan (崔光遠), Dong Qin (董秦), Li Guangbi, and Wang Sili (王思禮), were gathering at Yecheng and putting it under siege. An Qingxu tried to fight out of the siege, but was defeated by Tang forces, and his brother An Qinghe (安慶和) was killed. Meanwhile, with Shi recently having again rebelled against Tang, An sent the general Xue Song to Fanyang to seek aid from Shi, offering the throne to him. Shi thus advanced south toward Yecheng. Meanwhile, Tang forces, under the command of nine generals (with Li Siye having died during the siege), were uncoordinated. On 7 April 759, Shi engaged Tang forces—and, when a storm suddenly arrived, both armies panicked; Shi's forces fled north, and Tang forces fled south, lifting the siege on Yecheng. An Qingxu's forces gathered the food and supplies abandoned by Tang forces, and An thereafter considered, with Sun Xiaozhe (孫孝哲) and Cui, the possibility of refusing Shi, who gathered his troops and again approached Yecheng, admittance. Shi himself was not communicating with An, but was feasting his soldiers and watching Yecheng. Zhang and Gao Shang (高尚) requested permission to meet Shi, and An agreed; Shi gave them gifts and let them return to Yecheng. An, unsure what to do, again offered the throne to Shi, which Shi declined. Shi instead suggested to him that perhaps they could both be emperors of independent, allied states. An, pleased, exited Yecheng and met with Shi to swear to the alliance.

When An met Shi, he knelt down to thank Shi for his help, stating:

I did not have the abilities to uphold the empire; I lost the two capitals and was put under siege. I did not know that Your Royal Highness would, on account of the Taishang Huang [i.e., An Lushan], arrive from afar to save me from death. I have no way to repay your kindness.

Shi suddenly changed his expression and rebuked An:

Losing the two capitals is nothing worthy to be mentioned. You were a son, and you killed your father and usurped his throne. Heaven, earth, and the gods cannot tolerate you. I am attacking the bandits on behalf of the Taishang Huang, and I will not listen to your flattery.

Shi then executed An Qingxu, his four brothers, Gao, Sun, and Cui. He took over An's territory and troops and soon claimed for himself the title of emperor of Yan.

== Personal ==
Son to An Lushan and Lady Kang (executed in 755), An Lushan's first wife.

== Popular culture ==
- Portrayed by Mao Zijun in the 2017 Chinese television series The Glory of Tang Dynasty

Regnal titles
| Preceded by An Lushan | Emperor of Yan (Anshi); 757–759 | Succeeded by Shi Siming |
