= Jiedushi =

Imperial Chinese regional military governors

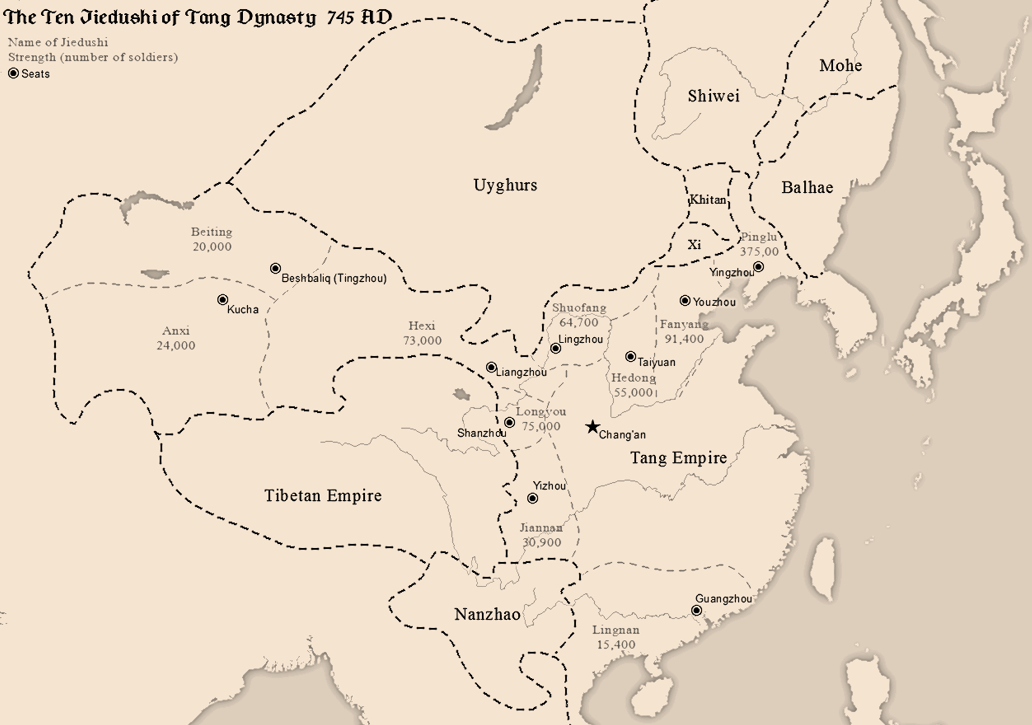
- Map of the 10 major jiedushi of the Tang dynasty and their military strengths c. 745, during Emperor Xuanzong's reign

Chinese name
- Traditional Chinese: 節度使
- Simplified Chinese: 节度使
- Literal meaning: "section planning representative(s)"
Transcriptions
Standard Mandarin
- Hanyu Pinyin: jiédùshǐ
- Wade–Giles: chieh^{2}-tu^{4}-shih^{3}
- IPA: [tɕjě.tû.ʂɨ̀]
Yue: Cantonese
- Yale Romanization: jit-douh-sí
- Jyutping: zit^{3}-dou^{6}-si^{2}
- IPA: [tsit̚˧ tɔw˨ si˧˥]

Vietnamese name
- Vietnamese: tiết độ sứ

Korean name
- Hangul: 절도사
Transcriptions
- Revised Romanization: jeoldosa

Old Turkic name
- Old Turkic: tarduş

The jiedushi or jiedu was a regional military governor in imperial China. The title was established in the Tang dynasty and abolished in the Yuan dynasty. The post of jiedushi has been translated as "military commissioner" or "governor", "legate", and "regional commander". Originally introduced in AD 711 to counter external threats, the jiedushi were posts authorized with the supervision of a defense command often encompassing several prefectures, the ability to maintain their own armies, collect taxes and promote and appoint subordinates.

Powerful jiedushi warlords eventually became fanzhen rulers, able to override the power of the central government of Tang. An early example of this was An Lushan, who was appointed jiedushi of three regions, which he used to start the An Lushan Rebellion that abruptly ended the golden age of the Tang dynasty. Even after the difficult suppression of that rebellion, some jiedushi such as the Three Fanzhen of Hebei were allowed to retain their powers due to the weakened state of the court. The jiedushi were one of the primary factors which contributed to the political division of the Five Dynasties and Ten Kingdoms period, a period marked by continuous infighting among rival kingdoms, dynasties, and regional regimes established by the jiedushi.

== History ==
=== 710s ===
Hexi Jiedushi was created in 711 and headquartered in Liang Prefecture. It was lost to the Tibetan Empire in 766. Wang Junchuo (王君㚟), Xiao Song, Niu Xianke, Geshu Han, and Cui Xiyi (崔希逸) were jiedushi of Hexi.

Longyou Jiedushi was created in 713 and headquartered in Shan Prefecture (Ledu, Qinghai). In 747, Geshu Han was appointed jiedushi of Longyou.

Shuofang Jiedushi was created in 713 and headquartered in Ling Prefecture (southwest of Lingwu, Ningxia). It controlled Ordos, Ningxia, and north Shanxi. In 756 the jiedushi of Shuofang, Guo Ziyi, defeated the rebel Shi Siming in Hebei and recovered Chang'an and Luoyang from the rebels in 757. He was made Commandery Prince of Fenyang in 762 and retook Chang'an from the Tibetan Empire in 763. Shuofang was taken over by the warlord Han Zun (韓遵) in 887.

Youzhou Jiedushi, also known as Fanyang Jiedushi, was created in 713. It assumed control of Lulong in 762 and controlled You, Ji, Ping, Tan, Gui, and Yan prefectures. Its territory lay primarily in Tianjin north of the Hai River and parts of Beijing. It was headquartered in Ji county (southwest of Beijing). An Lushan was promoted to jiedushi of Pinglu, Fanyang (in north Hebei), and Hedong (central Shanxi) with an army of 150 000. He rebelled against the Tang dynasty in 755. Li Guangbi was promoted to jiedushi of Fanyang after recovering much territory from the rebels in Hebei, but he died soon after in 764. Li Huaixian, former general of An Lushan, delivered Shi Chaoyi's head to the Tang and surrendered in 763, becoming jiedushi of Youzhou and Lulong. Zhang Shougui (張守珪) was a jiedushi of Youzhou. Zhu Tao was a jiedushi of Lulong.

Jiannan Jiedushi was created in 719 and headquartered in Yi Prefecture (益州) (Chengdu). It was split into Jiannan Dongchuan Jiedushi and Jiannan Xichuan Jiedushi in 757 and then merged again from 763 to 764, and then split again from 766 to 779. It controlled 25 prefectures in Chengdu and areas to its north and south in Sichuan. East River controlled 12 prefectures from Jiange to Luzhou. It was headquartered in Zi Prefecture (梓州) (Santai, Sichuan). West River controlled the Chengdu area and surrounding prefectures. Wei Gao and Xianyu Zhongtong were jiedushi of Jiannan.

Pinglu Jiedushi was created in 719 and headquartered in Ying Prefecture (營州) (Chaoyang, Liaoning). It controlled Pinglu, Lulong and other prefectures in Liaoyang, Jinzhou, Liaoning, and northeast Hebei.

=== 730s ===
Hedong Jiedushi was created in 730 and headquartered in Taiyuan, controlling Shi, Lan, Fen, Xin, and Dai prefectures in central and north Shanxi. Liu Gongchuo (柳公綽) was a jiedushi of Hedong. In 883 Li Keyong was appointed jiedushi of Hedong after recovering Chang'an from Huang Chao. In 885 Li Keyong captured Chang'an and laid waste to it. He was defeated by Zhu Wen in 902 and died in 908. Liu Zhiyuan was a jiedushi of Hedong.

Lingwu Jiedushi was created in 733 and headquartered in Huile (回樂) (southwest of Lingwu, Ningxia). It controlled Ling, Hui, and Yan prefectures.

=== 750s ===
Huainan West Circuit Jiedushi, also known as Huaixi Jiedushi, was created in 756 and lasted until 818. It was headquartered in Yingchuan Prefecture (潁川郡) (Xuchang, Henan), Zhengzhou (in Henan), Shou Prefecture (Shou County, Anhui), An Prefecture (Anlu northwest of Wuhan, Hubei), Cai Prefecture (Runan County, southeast Henan) from 773 to 776, and Bian Prefecture (Kaifeng, Henan) from 776 to 779. In 757 Gao Shi was appointed jiedushi of Huainan. Li Zhongchen was jiedushi until he was expelled by his nephew Li Xilie. Wu Yuanji and Wang Bo were jiedushi of Huainan.

Jiangxi Jiedushi was created in 756 and headquartered in Hong Prefecture (Nanchang, Jiangxi). It was renamed Zhennan Jiedushi in 865. It controlled Hong, Jiang, Xin, Yuan, Fu, Rao, Qian, and Ji prefectures, covering mostly Jiangxi. Li Gao was the jiedushi of Jiangxi during the Li Xilie rebellion.

Lingnan Jiedushi was created in 756 and headquartered in Guangzhou. It ended in 862 when its territory was split into West and East circuits. Lingnan West Circuit covered Guangxi and northern Vietnam. It was headquartered in Yong Prefecture (邕州) (south of Nanning, Guangxi). Lingnan East Circuit covered Guangdong and was headquartered in Guangzhou.

Hezhong Jiedushi was created in 757 and headquartered in Hedong (southwest of Yongji, Shanxi). It controlled Jin, Jiang, Ci, and Xi prefectures.

Jingli Jiedushi was created in 757 and headquartered in Jingzhou (Jingzhou District, south central Hubei). It controlled 17 prefectures in Jingzhou, Hubei, Changde, and Hunan. It was annexed by Zhu Wen in 905.

Shannan East Circuit Jiedushi was created in 757 and headquartered in Xiangzhou. Its territory encompassed areas of Suizhou, Shiyan, Hubei, Nanyang, and Henan. In 763 Liang Chongyi was appointed jiedushi of Shannan East Circuit. He committed suicide in 781. Yu Di was a jiedushi of Shannan East Circuit.

Zhenhai Army Jiedushi, also known as Zhejiang West Circuit Jiedushi (浙江西道) was created in 758 and lay in parts of Jiangsu, Zhejiang, Anhui, and Jiangxi. It was headquartered in Sheng Prefecture (昇州) (Nanjing, Jiangsu) and Suzhou (Jiangsu). In 761 it moved to Xuanzhou (Xuancheng, southeast Anhui), 787 to Runzhou (Zhenjiang, Jiangsu), and 808 to Hangzhou (Zhejiang). The jiedushi of Zhenhai Army, Du Shenquan, played a pivotal role in defeating the rebel Pang Xun. Han Huang, another jiedushi of Zhenhai Army, was chief minister in 785.

Zhenwu Jiedushi was created in 758 and headquartered in the Chanyu Protectorate (northwest of Horinger). It controlled the Chanyu Protectorate, Lin Prefecture (麟州), Sheng Prefecture (勝州), East Shouxiang city (東受降城), and held areas in Shenmu (Shaanxi), and Baotou in Inner Mongolia. It was merged into Shuofang Jiedushi in 764. Zhuye Chixin was a jiedushi of Zhenwu.

Binning Jiedushi existed from 759 until 885, when it was renamed Jingnan Army. It was headquartered in Bin Prefecture (Shaanxi) and governed Changwu and parts of Gansu.

Shanguo Jiedushi was created in 759 and headquartered in Shanzhou. It controlled Shan, Guo, and Hua prefectures. It was renamed Baoyi Army in 889.

=== 760s ===
Fengxiang Jiedushi was created in 760 and included Fengxiang and Long Prefecture (隴州) (Long County, Shaanxi and Huating County, Gansu). It was headquartered in Fengxiang. Li Maozhen and Zheng Zhu were jiedushi of Fengxiang.

Chengde Army Jiedushi was one of the Three Fanzhen of Hebei after the An Lushan Rebellion. From 762 it was headquartered in Heng Prefecture (恆州)/Zhen Prefecture (鎮州) (Zhengding, Hebei), and controlled Heng, Ji, Shen, Zhao, De, and Di prefectures. Its territory were primarily located in Shijiazhuang, Zanhuang, and Hebei. Li Baochen, adopted son of An Lushan, was in charge of Heng Prefecture under An Qingxu. He surrendered to Tang and retained control over central Hebei east of the Taihang Mountains. Li Weiyue requested succession of Chengde Army in 781 and was denied, so he rebelled, and was killed a year later by his subordinate general Wang Wujun. Han Lingkun, Wang Chengzong, Wang Tingcou were jiedushi of the Chengde Army.

Henan Jiedushi was revived in 762 and was sometimes known as the Biansong Jiedushi from then onward. It officially became the Biansong Jiedushi in 776 until 781 when it was renamed Xuanwu Army. The Biansong Jiedushi was headquartered in Bian Prefecture (Kaifeng), and governed Shangqiu as well as east Henan. In 781 its seat was moved to Song Prefecture (宋州) (south of Shangqiu, east central Henan). Biansong Jiedushi was the home territory of Zhu Wen.

Ziqing-Pinglu Jiedushi was created in 762 and headquartered in Qingzhou, Shandong. It controlled 15 prefectures encompassing most of Shandong and parts of Henan, Anhui, and Jiangsu. Li Zhengji became the jiedushi of Ziqing-Pinglu after the An Lushan Rebellion and worked together with Tian Yue to curtail the imperial court's attempt to weaken local powers.

Weibo Jiedushi was created in 763 and headquartered in Wei Prefecture (northeast of Daming County and southeast of Handan, south Hebei). It controlled Wei, Bo, Bei, Wei, Chan, and Xiang prefectures in Shandong, north Henan, and south Hebei. It was renamed Tianxiong Army in 904. Tian Chengsi, Tian Hongzheng, Tian Xu were jiedushi of Weibo.

Zhaoyi Army Jiedushi was created in 766 and headquartered in Xiang Prefecture (Anyang, Henan).

Jingyuan Jiedushi was created in 768 and lasted until 894 when it was renamed Zhangyi Army. Jingyuan's territory was located in Jingchuan, Zhenyuan, Gansu, and Ningxia. Its headquarter was in Jing Prefecture (north of Jingchuan, northeast Gansu. Surviving the Battle of Talas in 751, Duan Xiushi went on to become the jiedushi of Jingyuan until he was dismissed in 780 by Yang Yan. He was killed during the Jingyuan mutiny in 783 for denouncing the usurper Zhu Ci. Jingyuan was annexed by Li Maozhen in 899.

=== 780s ===
Shannan West Circuit Jiedushi was created in 780 and headquartered in Liang Prefecture (梁州) (east of Hanzhong, Shaanxi). It was annexed by Wang Jian in 902.

Heyang Sancheng Jiedushi was created in 781 and headquartered in Heyang (河陽) (south of Mengzhou). It controlled Mengzhou and Mengjin.

Yiwu Military Province was created in 782, headquartered at Dingzhou in modern Baoding, Hebei.

Henghai Army Jiedushi was created in 785 and lasted until 829. It was headquartered in Cangzhou (southeast Hebei) and controlled Cang, Jing, De, and Di prefectures.

Xiasui Jiedushi was created in 787 and controlled Xia, Sui, Yin, and You prefectures in Shenmu and south Ih Ju League, Inner Mongolia.

=== 790s ===
Wuning Jiedushi was created in 795 and headquartered in Xuzhou. Shi Pu was a jiedushi of Wuning. Wang Shi was appointed jiedushi of Wuning in 862.

=== 813 ===
Caizhou Jiedushi controlled Cai, Shen, and Guang prefectures around 813. It was headquartered in Runan, southeast Henan.

Chenxu Jiedushi was in charge of Chen and Xu prefectures around 813. It was headquartered in Xuchang.

Eyue Jiedushi was in charge of E, Mian, An, Huang, Qi, and Yue prefectures around 813. It was headquartered in Jiangxia (Wuchang, Hubei).

Xiangyang Jiedushi controlled Xiang, Deng, Fu, Ying, Tang, Sui, Jun, and Fang prefectures in north Hubei and southwest Henan around 813. It was headquartered in Xiangyang.

Xusi Jiedushi controlled Xu, Su, and Hao prefectures around 813. It was headquartered in Xuzhou.

Zhenghua Jiedushi controlled Zheng and Hua prefectures around 813. It was headquartered in Baima.

=== 850s ===
In 851 the Guiyi Army Jiedushi was created from territories reclaimed by Zhang Yichao from the Tibetan Empire. It was situated east Xinjiang and Gansu, and was headquartered in Sha Prefecture (west of Dunhuang, Gansu).

=== 940s ===
Qingyuan Army Jiedushi was created in 949 and headquartered in Quanzhou. It controlled Zhangzhou, Xiamen, and other areas in Fujian. Liu Congxiao was made jiedushi of Qingyuan Army in 949 after Wang Yanzheng's fall.

=== 950s ===
In 951 Bian Hao crushed Chu and was promoted to jiedushi of Wu'an Army (in Hunan).

== Jiedushi titles ==
- Anhua Jiedushi (安化)
- Biansong Jiedushi (汴宋)
- Binning Jiedushi (邠寧)
- Caizhou Jiedushi (蔡州)
- Chengde Military Province Jiedushi (成德軍)
- Chengxu Jiedushi (陳許)
- Eyue Jiedushi (鄂岳)
- Fanyang Jiedushi (范陽)
- Fenghua Jiedushi (奉化)
- Fengxiang Jiedushi (鳳翔)
- Fufang Jiedushi (鄜坊)
- Guiyi Army Jiedushi (歸義軍)
- Hedong Jiedushi (河東)
- Henan Jiedushi (河南)
- Henghai Army Jiedushi (橫海軍)
- Hexi Jiedushi (河西)
- Heyangsancheng Jiedushi (河陽三城)
- Hezhong Jiedushi (河中)
- Huainan Jiedushi (淮南)
- Huaixi Jiedushi (淮西)
- Jiangxi Jiedushi (江西)
- Jiannan Jiedushi (劍南)
- Jiannan East River Jiedushi (劍南東川)
- Jiannan West River Jiedushi (劍南西川)
- Jianxiong Army Jiedushi (建雄軍)
- Jinghai Jiedushi (靜海)
- Jingjiang Army Jiedushi (靜江軍)
- Jingli Jiedushi (荊澧)
- Jingyuan Jiedushi (涇原)
- Lingnan Jiedushi (嶺南)
- Lingwu Jiedushi (靈武)
- Lulong Jiedushi (盧龍)
- Ningyuan Army Jiedushi (寧遠軍)
- Pinglu Jiedushi (平盧)
- Qingyuan Army Jiedushi (清源軍)
- Qinlong Jiedushi (秦隴)
- Shanguo Jiedushi (陜虢)
- Shannan Jiedushi (山南)
- Shannan East Circuit Jiedushi (山南東道)
- Shannan West Circuit Jiedushi (山南西道)
- Shuofang Jiedushi (朔方)
- Tianxiong Army Jiedushi (天雄軍)
- Weibo Jiedushi (魏博)
- Weiwu Army Jiedushi (威武軍)
- Wu'an Army Jiedushi (武安軍)
- Wuchang Jiedushi (武昌)
- Wuning Jiedushi (武寧)
- Xiangyang Jiedushi (襄陽)
- Xiasui Jiedushi (夏绥)
- Xuanwu Army Jiedushi (宣武軍)
- Xusi Jiedushi (徐泗)
- Yanmen Jiedushi (t 雁門 or 鴈門, s 雁门)
- Yiding Jiedushi (易定)
- Yiwu Military Province Jiedushi (義武軍)
- Youzhou Jiedushi (幽州)
- Zhaoyi Army Jiedushi (昭義軍)
- Zhendong Jiedushi (鎮東)
- Zhenghua Jiedushi (鄭滑)
- Zhenhai Army Jiedushi (鎮海軍)
- Zhennan Jiedushi (鎮南)
- Zhenwu Jiedushi (振武)
- Zhongwu Jiedushi (中吳)
- Ziqing-Pinglu Jiedushi (淄青平盧)

== Notable jiedushi ==
Notable jiedushi:

- An Lushan
- Abe no Nakamaro
- Gao Xianzhi
- Geshu Han
- Guo Ziyi
- Qu Chengyu
- Li Keyong
- Li Cunxu
- Li Maozhen
- Liu Congjian
- Liu Rengong
- Liu Shouguang
- Li Jiqian
- Li Guangbi
- Shi Jingtang
- Shi Siming
- Tian Chengsi
- Wang Zhongsi
- Zhu Wen

== See also ==
- Administrative divisions of the Tang Empire
- Li Shidao
- Wu Yuanheng
- Mufu
- Three Fanzhen of Hebei
- Roman Imperial Provincial Governor
