= Cannibalism in literature =

Cannibals in legends and works written before World War I

Cannibalism is depicted in literary and other imaginative works across history. Homer's Odyssey, Beowulf, Shakespeare's Titus Andronicus, Flaubert's Salammbo, and Melville's Moby Dick are prominent examples.

== European literature ==
=== Myths and legends of unaware cannibals ===
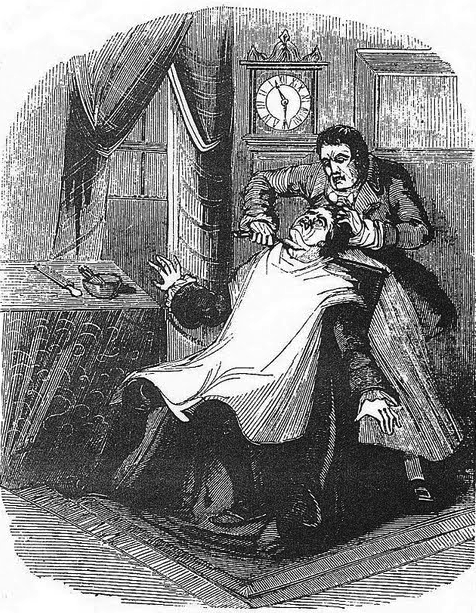
The mythical barber Sweeney Todd had his victim's bodies baked into meat pies sold to unsuspecting customers (who liked them a lot), according to the legend

Several myths and legends involve people eating human flesh without knowing what they are doing, being tricked by a murderous host. This motif has also been reflected in some early novels and plays.

In Greek mythology, Tantalus served the Olympian gods the flesh of his son, Pelops. None of the gods were fooled except for Demeter, who ate part of his shoulder. In another myth, the Thracian king Tereus raped his wife Procne's sister Philomela and cut out her tongue to prevent her from telling anyone. Philomela nevertheless notified Procne, who gained her revenge by serving Tereus the flesh of their son, Itys.

A similar motif can be found in the myth of the hostile brothers Atreus and Thyestes. Upon learning that his brother had committed adultery with his wife Aerope, Atreus killed and cooked Thyestes's sons, serving their flesh to his clueless brother. Afterwards he showed the hands and heads of the murdered boys to their shocked father.

Jaume Roig's 15th-century novel Espill features a scene in which female innkeepers served men's meat to eat in their Parisian restaurant. A similar motif, though with a male perpetrator, is associated with the legend of the English fictional character Sweeney Todd, whose victims were baked into meat pies which were then sold in a London pie shop.

In William Shakespeare's late-16th-century play Titus Andronicus, the character Tamora is unknowingly served a pie made from the remains of her two sons.

=== Poetry ===
In the Alliterative Morte Arthure, a Middle English poem written around 1400, King Arthur confronts and kills a cannibal giant whose lair is on Mont Saint Michel and who terrorizes Arthur's subjects in Brittany by kidnapping every day several of their children, whom he then eats "chopped up with pickle and spices on a silver dish". Approaching the giant's lair, Arthur finds several children being roasted "on spits that were being turned by ... maidens", who at nighttime "wait beside his bed in case he wants to have his way with them". The giant's "sensuous" cannibalism has been interpreted as a symbol of an emerging "consumer market", where the wealthy engage in "the pleasures and powers of artistic, artful preparation and consumption", with even children's bodies becoming a consumer good among many, to be cooked "to perfection" and then enjoyed.

Richard Coer de Lyon, a chanson de geste from the early 14th century, tells that King Richard I of England falls ill during his campaign in the Holy Land. His cook prepares a dish made from the flesh of a young Saracen, after which he recovers his strength. Upon being told what he has eaten, he smiles with satisfaction and remarks that the army will not lack provisions as long as there are enough Saracens. After the capture of Acre, envoys sent for negotiations are served the boiled heads of captured Saracens as part of a grim display directed at Saladin.

=== Travel narratives ===
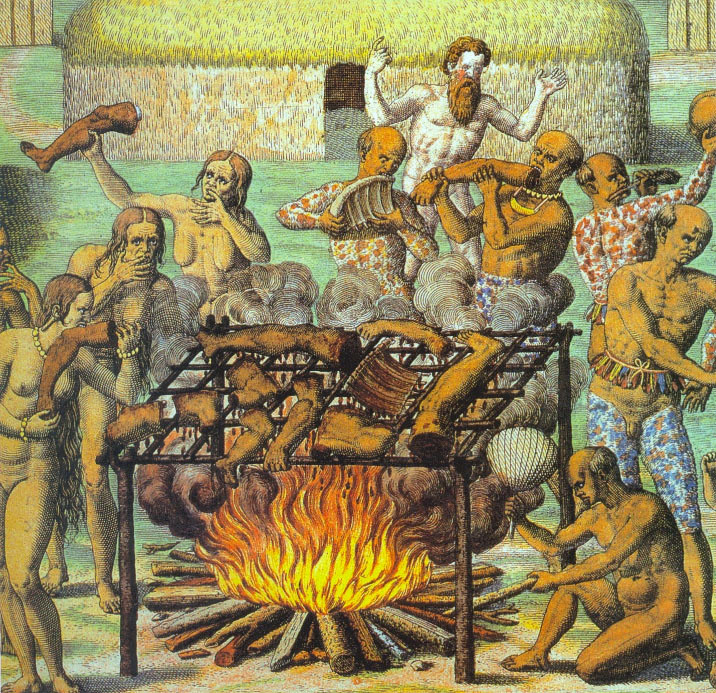
Brazilian Cannibals, depicted by Theodor de Bry for Jean de Léry's History of the Voyage to the Land of Brazil, Also Called America, 1578

Travel narrative is a literary genre characterized by factual reportage represented and interpreted through techniques better known in fiction. Other aspects of travel literature include the disciplines of ethnography, geography, history, economics, and aesthetics. Travel narratives were used in the ages of discovery to map the world and, during the exploration of the New World, establish traits of indigenous people, survey for gold, and relate back to sovereigns the positives of their investments while encouraging more travel. This style of writing can be traced back to the 1st century.

The word cannibal is derived from Spanish caníbal or caríbal, originally used as a name variant for the Kalinago (Island Caribs), a people from the West Indies said to have eaten human flesh. Their name became associated with human flesh eating due to the reports of Christopher Columbus and his associates from their voyages to the Caribbean in the late 15th century.

Herman Melville's Typee (1846) is a semi-factual account of Melville's voyage to the Pacific Island of Nuku Hiva, where he lived for several weeks among the island's inhabitants – portrayed as possibly practising cannibalism – before fleeing.

=== Fiction and satire ===
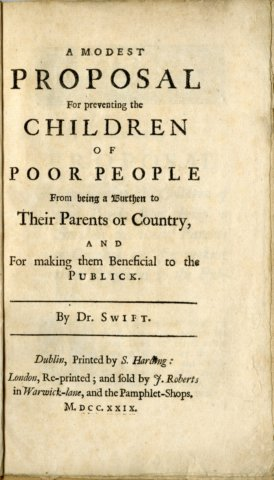
Cover of the first edition of Jonathan Swift's A Modest Proposal (1729)

Cannibalism comes up frequently in European literature during the High Middle Ages. The symbolism of cannibalism and representation of cannibals is used "as a literary response to the politics of external conquest, internal colonization, and territorial consolidation".

Jonathan Swift's satiric essay A Modest Proposal for Preventing the Children of Poor People in Ireland from Being a Burden to Their Parents or Country, and for Making Them Beneficial to the Public (1729) proposed that poor people sell their children to be eaten by the wealthy, claiming that this would benefit the economy, family values, and general happiness of Ireland. The target of Swift's satire is the rationalism of modern economics, and the growth of rationalistic modes of thinking at the expense of more traditional human values.

In Voltaire's Candide (1759), the protagonist meets an old woman who lacks a buttock. She tells him that as a teenager she was kidnapped and sold into sexual slavery, ultimately ending in the harem of a Turkish janissary. When defending the city of Azov against the Russians, the Turkish soldiers decided to kill and eat the two eunuchs guarding the harem after they had run out of all other provisions. They wanted to use the women for the same purpose, but "a very pious and humane imam" convinced them to "[o]nly cut off one of the buttocks of each" of them for consumption, thus maiming them but at least sparing their lives.

Cannibalism appears in several tales of the Marquis de Sade, whose protagonists enjoy surpassing all limits of generally accepted behaviour. In his novel Juliette, the heroine meets a gigantic ogre-like Muscovite named Minski who delights in raping and torturing young boys and girls to death before eating them. He keeps hundreds of children and teenagers as captives in his palace for this purpose, dining daily on their flesh and also serving it to his guests, including Juliette and her companions. Another man she meets, Brisatesta, tells that together with two other men he once raped a fifteen-year-old boy, afterwards roasting him "alive on the spit and eat[ing] him with relish". One of Brisatesta's companions calls it an "absurdity" to accept the butchering and eating of pigs as normal but to reject the same "operation" when performed on a human. In several of the stories told or sketched in Sade's unfinished novel The 120 Days of Sodom, cannibalism is practised to gain sexual pleasure.

In the short story "Captain Murderer" (1860), Charles Dickens retells the Bluebeard folktale with a cannibalistic twist. The title character marries frequently, killing each wife shortly after the wedding and baking her flesh in a huge meat pie for this consumption. He meets his demise after his sister-in-law, in revenge for the death of her sister (his next-to-last wife), marries him and consumes a deadly poison just before he kills and eats her. For theorists like James Marlow, Dickens's literary use of cannibalism could be an extension of his personal beliefs and fascinations, becoming more of a psychoanalytical tool rather than a literary one.

== North American literature ==
=== American literature ===
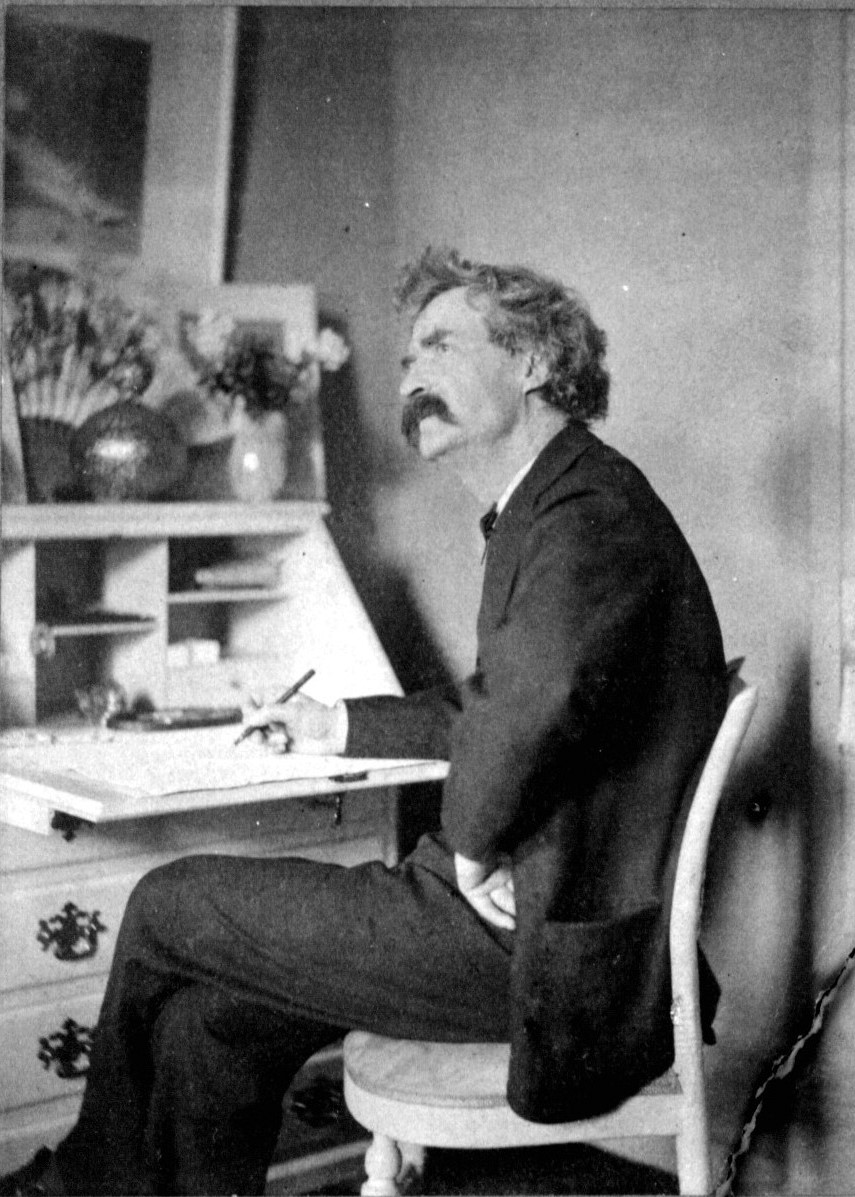
Mark Twain, aka, Samuel Clemens

"Cannibalism in the Cars" is an 1868 short story by Mark Twain in which the narrator meets a member of Congress who talks about their descent into cannibalism on a train. Twain's use of "parliamentary cannibalism" satirizes 19th century American politics.

== Asian literature ==
In Romance of the Three Kingdoms, Xiahou Dun engages in autocannibalism when he is shot in the eye in a show of bravery and filial piety. Additionally, while Liu Bei is travelling, he takes shelter with a hunter overnight. The hunter is unable to hunt any animals to feed him, and murders his own wife so that the visiting warlord might have meat. This pleases Cao Cao when he hears of it, and the hunter is rewarded. This showed the Confucian values of being filial and of respecting those of a higher rank than oneself, along with low status assigned to women at the time.

Multiple pieces of literature were inspired by an event during the An Lushan rebellion in the 8th century. During the defense of the city of Suiyang, two military officials named Zhang Xun and Xu Yuan sacrificed tens of thousands of civilians, including Zhang Xun's own concubine, to be eaten by their army to prevent starvation. Over time, the story of the cannibalized concubine inspired many novels and plays. Since many details were left out of the historical records, people were free to include their own interpretations. In the early Ming era, Yao Maoliang wrote the chuanqi drama Two Loyal Subjects (Shuangzhongji), in which Zhang Xun kills his concubine after she correctly guessed that he meant for her to be cooked. In the early Qing period, the novel Jinxiang ting was written, followed by a drama of the same title. Another chuanqi drama is Roseate Clouds in an Azure Sky (Bitian xia), in which the subordinates of Zhang Xun bury the concubine's meat rather than eating it. In another Qing drama, Integrity at Suiyang (Suiyang jie) by an unknown author, the otherwise often nameless concubine is given the name Cuiniang and appears as a kind of female knight-errant with a strong personality. An anonymous Puxian opera drama named Zhang Xun Kills His Concubine (Zhang Xun shaqie) interprets the story as a form of violence against women, while also dealing with women's sexuality.

The protagonists of the classic Chinese novel Water Margin engage in "various forms of cannibalism" in addition to "wanton killing" and "excessive retribution". When celebrating a victory, they sometimes "share their enemies' flesh piece by piece, an action combining cannibalism with lingchi", the slow slicing of somebody to death. Cannibalism is often mentioned in a "causal tone", with human flesh being eaten not just "in acts of revenge", but also "as a way of living". Bandits run inns where they sell the flesh of those they have robbed and killed to unsuspecting travellers; poor people sleeping alone in the street are at risk of being kidnapped and sold for food to an innkeeper. Noting that the outlaws celebrated in the novel were nevertheless widely regarded as "heroes and heroines" over centuries, educator William Sin states that one cannot divide "the meanings of [their] actions" from "the cultural background under which they [were] performed" and that it would be "hasty" to project concepts and values of today "onto the situation of a distant culture" where they may not have applied.

In Ming and Qing dynasty literature, filial children engage in the practice of gegu or cutting of their own flesh and feeding it to their parents in order to extend the lifespan of their parents.

== See also ==
- Cannibal film
- Cannibalism in popular culture
