= Siege of Yongqiu =

756 siege

- Part of the An Shi Rebellion
Date	Spring of 756 AD
Location	Yongqiu, China
Result	Tang victory

Belligerents
Tang dynasty	Yan

Commanders and leaders
Zhang Xun; Jia Bi	Linghu Chao

Strength
2,000; 4,000 (extended siege)	40,000; 100,000 (extended siege)

Casualties and losses
Less than 500; Less than 1,500 (extended siege)	20,000+ 63,500+ (extended siege)
- Followed by Siege of Suiyang

The siege of Yongqiu (雍丘之戰, pinyin: Yōngqiū zhī zhàn) was a siege for Yongqiu (current Qi County, Kaifeng) in 756 AD during the An Shi Rebellion, by the An Lushan rebels against the Tang army. The Tang army, led by Zhang Xun, finally won this battle.

== Background ==
An Lushan had enjoyed many successes early on in his rebellion. His army numbered more than 160,000, and was growing rapidly. In the fall of 755, An Lushan won a major victory at Luoyang, the eastern capital of the Tang dynasty. With civilians losing faith in the Tang dynasty, and more people and generals joining An Lushan's newly proclaimed Great Yan dynasty every day, it seemed that the Tang dynasty was near its end. An Lushan set his eyes on Chang'an, the capital of Tang.

Suiyang was of great military significance. It was the entry point to the Jianghuai region that provided the grain and transportation infrastructure supporting the northwestern war effort. If the Tang dynasty could defend this area, An Lushan's influence would be limited to northeast China for the time being. This would give the Tang dynasty enough time to stabilise the situation in the north and prepare defences further south. If An Lushan conquered this area quickly, he would be free to conquer the Jianghuai region and the rest of resource-rich southern China, dooming the isolated Jiedushi in the northwest. Yongqiu was an outlying fortress of Suiyang essential to its long-term security.

At this time, the governor of the Suiyang District, Yang Wanshi (楊萬石), decided to surrender to An Lushan. The governor of the city of Yongqiu, Linghu Chao (令狐潮), agreed with the surrender after the fall of Luoyang, which in his view made the Tang cause hopeless. The army commander of Suiyang Fortress at this time was Zhang Xun. He was ordered to follow Yang Wanshi in surrendering, and to receive the rebel army west of the city.

At around this point, the magistrate of Danfu Jia Bi (賈賁) defeated a rebel force led by Zhang Tongwu. Contemporaneously, Linghu Chao led a force to the east and defeated a Tang force from Xiangyi District, imprisoning a hundred captured soldiers within the fortress. Taking advantage of Linghu Chao's later absence from the city, these prisoners were able to escape and resist his reentry. After Linghu Chao escaped, the occupying troops welcomed Jia Bi, raising the number of defenders to 2,000. Zhang Xun refused to follow Yang Wanshí's surrender orders, and instead gathered 1,000 elites picked from several thousand citizens and soldiers, and joined up with Jia Bi, after leading his retinue in a tearful worship of the Tang Emperor's ancestor. There were now around 3,000 soldiers in Yongqiu. Linghu Chao's wife and children were executed, because he was a rebel.

On the 16th of the Second Month, Linghu Chao led 15,000 elite rebels back to Yongqiu, to try to take back the fortress. In the first encounter, Jia Bi led an attack, but was defeated and killed. Zhang Xun repelled the enemy, performing bravely, and was hailed as leader. He repelled several attacks over the month and caused enemy losses of more than 10,000 men, forcing Linghu Chao to retreat. Zhang Xun reported the battle situation to Li Zhi, Prince of Wu, stationed in Pengcheng (now Xuzhou, Jiangsu). Li Zhi entrusted the war to the east of Yanzhou to Zhang Xun. From then on, Zhang Xun called himself the vanguard of the Prince of Wu and took on the responsibility of defending Yongqiu.

On the 2nd of the Third Month, Linghu Chao, together with rebel generals Li Huaixin, Yang Chaozong and Xie Yuanshang, returned to besiege Yongqiu with 40,000 troops. Only about 2,000 Tang soldiers were still capable of defending Yongqiu.

== Process ==
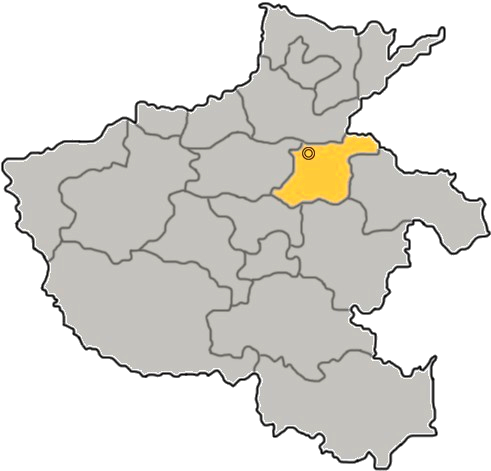
Location of Kaifeng, where Yongqiu was

The people in the city were terrified and had no confidence in defending the city. After careful consideration and analysis of the enemy's situation, Zhang Xun made a bold decision. He said to his generals, "The enemy's troops are elite and look down on us. If we catch them off guard and attack them now, they will surely be shocked and defeated. If the enemy's momentum is slightly weakened, then the city can be defended." All the generals agreed. Zhang Xun immediately ordered a thousand people to defend the city, while he led a thousand people, divided into several teams, suddenly opened the city gate and charged straight into the rebel army's formation. The rebel army had just arrived and was not yet stable, so they were shocked and retreated.

The next day, the rebel army surrounded and attacked the city again, surrounding the city with a hundred traction trebuchets, destroying the city towers and the battlements of the city walls. Zhang Xun set up wooden fences on the city to block the rebel army's attack. The rebel army had no other choice but to launch a frontal assault, climbing up the city walls with siege ladders. Zhang Xun had expected the siege, and prior to the battle ordered many grass-balls be made. He ordered his troops to dip these grass-balls into oil, and then light them up just before throwing them at the enemy. As the siege ladders burned, many of Linghu Chao's men burned or fell to their deaths. Linghu Chao called off the assaults and decided to maintain a blockade on the city.

Sometimes Zhang Xun took advantage of the enemy's slackness and suddenly sent troops to attack; sometimes in the deep of the night, he sneaked into the enemy's camp. He augmented the effect of these maneuvers by ordered his troops to play war drums during night time, which forced the rebels to prepare for battle. But the fortress gates remained closed, and no Tang troops appeared. After this was repeated many times, the rebels eventually grew tired and ignored the war drums, whereupon Zhang Xun would attack. This was highly detrimental to the rebel army's morale, and Linghu Chao would sporadically resume the assaults.

In this way, the Tang troops defended the city for more than 60 days, fighting more than 300 battles, large and small, wearing armor while eating, and fighting with wounds. They finally repelled the rebel army and pursued them, annihilating more than 2,000 enemy soldiers in the final assault, and almost capturing Linghu Chao alive.

In mid-May, Linghu Chao led his troops to surround and attack Yongqiu again. Linghu Chao, who was acquainted with Zhang Xun in the past, came to the city and tried to persuade Zhang Xun to surrender. Linghu Chao said, "The imperial court is in danger, and the troops cannot leave the pass. The world's affairs are gone. You are defending a dangerous city with weak soldiers; your loyalty has no base. Why not follow me to seek wealth and glory?" Zhang Xun flatly refused and took the opportunity to shame Linghu Chao, saying, "In ancient times, when a father died for the emperor, he did not report it. You are harboring resentment for your wife and children, borrowing strength from the enemy to plot against me. I will see your head on the street, being laughed at for generations, how can you do that?" Linghu Chao heard this and retreated in shame.

At this time, Linghu Chao had been besieging Zhang Xun in Yongqiu for more than 40 days, and they had lost contact with the court. When Linghu Chao learned that Chang'an had fallen and Emperor Xuanzong had fled to Shu (modern day Sichuan), he wrote a letter to Zhang Xun, trying to persuade him to surrender again. This was a major blow to morale of Zhang Xun's army. Among the defending generals, there were six who thought that the situation was hopeless and the fate of Xuanzong was unknown, and advised Zhang Xun to surrender. Zhang Xun pretended to agree. The next day, Zhang Xun hung Xuanzong's portrait in the hall and led his generals to worship, and everyone cried. Zhang Xun then brought the six generals to the front of the hall, blamed them for their lack of loyalty, and beheaded them, further strengthening the army's determination to defend the city.

At that time, Linghu Chao's blockade was having an effect. Food was scarce, but the rebel army's hundreds of ships carrying salt and rice were about to arrive at the front line. When Zhang Xun learned of this, he used the tactic of attacking the east and surprising the west. He led his troops to attack at night in the south of the city, and Linghu Chao heard the news and led his troops to fight. However, Zhang Xun sent brave soldiers to the river, seized the rebel army's salt and rice, burned the rest, and then safely returned to the city. Small amounts of food and supplies were also obtained from the enemy in periodic raids and attacks.

The siege continued, and after 20 more days, Zhang Xun's troops had run low on arrows. He ordered his troops to make about 1,000 scarecrows, dressed in black clothes. During the night, the soldiers hung the scarecrows down the fortress wall, so as to be easily seen. Linghu Chao noticed a number of black figures in the distance, and ordered his archers to shoot at them, hoping to stop the attack. When the scarecrows got pulled back over the wall, along with numerous embedded arrows, Linghu Chao realized that he had been deceived. He ordered his troops to never shoot at any black figures hanging down the wall, since it would be a waste of arrows. As a result, on the second night after the incident, no arrow was shot at the scarecrows.

A few nights later, black figures were once again hung down from the wall, and they were once again ignored. This time the black figures, however, were not scarecrows. They were 500 of Zhang Xun's best men. They began the most damaging ambush of the siege. Many rebels were killed during their sleep. An estimated 10,000 men either were killed or deserted, and the camp was burned. The remaining force of about 20,000 men fled for about 10 miles, pursued by the Tang troops, before reorganizing.

Linghu Chao refused to retreat, and returned to Yongqiu to continue the siege in rage at being continuously tricked. Zhang Xun ordered the general Lei Wanchun to talk to Linghu Chao on the city wall, and the rebel army took the opportunity to shoot Lei Wanchun with a crossbow. Although Lei Wanchun was shot in the face six times, he still stood tall and motionless. Linghu Chao suspected it was a wooden man, so he sent soldiers to investigate and found out it was really Lei Wanchun. He was very surprised and said to Zhang Xun from afar, "I saw General Lei just now, and I know your military orders, but what about the way of heaven?" Zhang Xun replied, "You don't understand human relationships, how can you know the way of heaven!"

Zhang Xun was running low on lumber. He made Linghu Chao an offer: if Linghu Chao would move back 30 miles, and allow Zhang Xun and his men to escape, the fortress would be his. The battle-worn Linghu Chao immediately accepted. He moved his troops and supplies back 30 miles, but he did not remove the wooden huts and tents. Zhang Xun immediately ordered his troops and civilians to tear down the huts and tents and surroundings houses, and bring the lumber back into the fortress. By the time Linghu Chao figured out Zhang Xun's plan, it was too late.

Linghu Chao was furious and surrounded the city again, blaming Zhang Xun for not keeping his word. Zhang Xun said to Linghu Chao, "You need this city, return me thirty horses, and I will leave. Please take the city as you wish." Linghu Chao really sent thirty horses. After Zhang Xun got the horses, he gave them all to his brave generals and said to them, "When the enemy comes, each of you take one general." The next day, Linghu Chao asked Zhang Xun why he had not left the city to surrender, and Zhang Xun said, "I want to leave, but my soldiers won't follow, what can I do?" Linghu Chao realized he had been tricked by Zhang Xun again and prepared to attack the city, but before he could finish setting up his formation, Zhang Xun's thirty brave generals suddenly killed out, and soon Zhang Xun led his troops to attack, capturing fourteen enemy generals, killing more than a hundred enemies, and seizing weapons and horses. The rebel army fled in the night and retreated to Chenliu, not daring to come out to fight again.

Soon after, there were more than 7,000 rebel troops stationed at Baisha Wo, and Zhang Xun led his troops to attack at night, defeating the rebel army. When Zhang Xun returned to Taoling (now southeast of Grains County, Henan), he encountered more than 400 rebel reinforcements and captured them all. Zhang Xun separated the captured rebels, killing all the Hu people from the states of Gui and Tan, and released the coerced soldiers from Yingyang and Chenliu, allowing them to return to their homes. Within ten days, more than 10,000 households came to surrender to Zhang Xun.

In the same month, Linghu Chao led his deputy general Ju Binyu to attack Yongqiu again. Linghu Chao first sent four envoys into the city to persuade them to surrender, but Zhang Xun executed them all and then sent their followers to Li Zhi, his nominal superior.

By this time, the rebels' morale had reached an all-time low. Eventually, Linghu Chao retreated with his forces to modern day Kaifeng with less than 20,000 men. In 4 months of battle, Zhang Xun's much smaller army had decisively defeated the rebels.

== Aftermath ==
Smaller scale sieges and battles around the Yongqiu area continued well into November. Yan's army, when it needed to pass through this area, tried to go around the fortress instead of besieging it. But Zhang Xun led many ambushes against these attempts, with very successful results. In August, the famous Yan general Li Tingwang (李庭望) led an army of 20,000 to besiege Yongqiu. Zhang Xun ambushed them at night with 3,000 men, and killed over 10,000 rebels in the chaos. Li Ting Wang retreated before he even reached the fortress. In both October and November, Linghu Chao led two separate sieges of 10,000 men each, and both ended in failure.

By now, Zhang Xun had become famous for successfully defending against sieges despite seemingly overwhelming odds. Yan's army shifted their tactics. In December, Linghu Chao built a fortress north of Yongqiu to cut off Yongqiu's last supply route. Simultaneously, they also sent troops to attack Ruguan (now Yanzhou, Shandong), Dongping (now northwest of Dongping, Shandong), and Jiying (now southwest of Dingtao, Shandong), which were all captured by the rebel army. Henan Jiedushi Li Ju retreated his troops east to Linhuai, while rebel general named Yang Chaozong (楊朝宗) led 20,000 rebels to the south of Yongqiu, to attack Ningling (寧陵) (in modern-day Henan) and cut off Zhang Xun's retreat route.

In this situation, Yongqiu was no longer defensible, so Zhang Xun voluntarily abandoned Yongqiu and led 300 horses and 3,000 soldiers to defend Ningling, joining forces with Suiyang governor Xu Yuan and Chengfu county magistrate Yao Yu. On the same day, Yang Chaozong led his troops to the northwest of Ningling, and Zhang Xun and Xu Yuan sent generals Lei Wanchun and Nan Gaiyun to meet the enemy. After a day and night of fierce fighting, they heavily defeated Yang Chaozong's troops, killing 20 enemy generals, beheading more than 10,000 enemies, and the corpses filled the Bian River and flowed down. Yang Chaozong gathered his remaining troops and fled in the night. Emperor Suzong sent an edict appointing Zhang Xun as the deputy governor of Henan, commanding the war in the Jianghuai area. Zhang Xun believed that his soldiers had made great contributions, so he sent envoys to Guo Wang Li Ju to request blank appointments and rewards, but Li Ju only gave thirty appointments for Zhezhong Duda and Guoyi Duda, without any rewards. Zhang Xun wrote a letter blaming Li Ju, saying, "The imperial court is still in danger, and I am defending a lonely city outside. How can you be stingy with rewards and money?" Li Ju did not reply.

At this time, the war against the rebels gradually worsened. In the second year of Zhide (757), An Lushan was killed by his son An Qingxu (安慶緒), and An Qingxu occupied Luoyang and declared himself emperor. The rebel general Shi Siming retook the counties of Hebei, then besieged the isolated city of Taiyuan, intending to capture Hedong and then take the areas of Peifang, Hexi, and Longyou. An Qingxu appointed Yi Ziqi (尹子奇) as the governor of Henan and led his troops to attack Suiyang, intending to penetrate towards the Yangtze River and seize the region's financial resources. Thus, the focus of the battle turned to the strategic locations of Taiyuan and Suiyang, and if either of them was captured, the consequences would be disastrous.

On the twenty-fifth day of the first lunar month, Yin Zhiqi led troops from the states of Gui and Tan, as well as the armies of Tongluo, Tujue, and Xi, and joined forces with Yang Chaozong, gathering a total of 130,000 troops to attack Suiyang. Suiyang governor Xu Yuan heard the news and urgently informed Zhang Xun. Zhang Xun led more than 3,000 soldiers from Ningling into Suiyang and joined forces with Xu Yuan, gathering a total of 6,800 soldiers to participate in the Battle of Suiyang.
