= A Curious Dream =

- Directed by: J. Stuart Blackton
- Written by: Mark Twain (story)
- Production company: Vitagraph Company of America
- Distributed by: Vitagraph Company of America
- Release date: March 16, 1907
- Running time: 300 feet 5-6 minutes
- Country: United States
- Language: Silent

A Curious Dream is a 1907 short drama film based on Mark Twain's short story of the same name, collected in Sketches New and Old. Twain himself provided the following testimonial: "Gentlemen: I authorize the Vitagraph Company of America to make a moving picture from my 'Curious Dream'. I have their picture of John Barter, examining his gravestone, and find it frightfully and deliciously humorous".
