= Cannibalism in the Cars =

1868 short story by Mark Twain

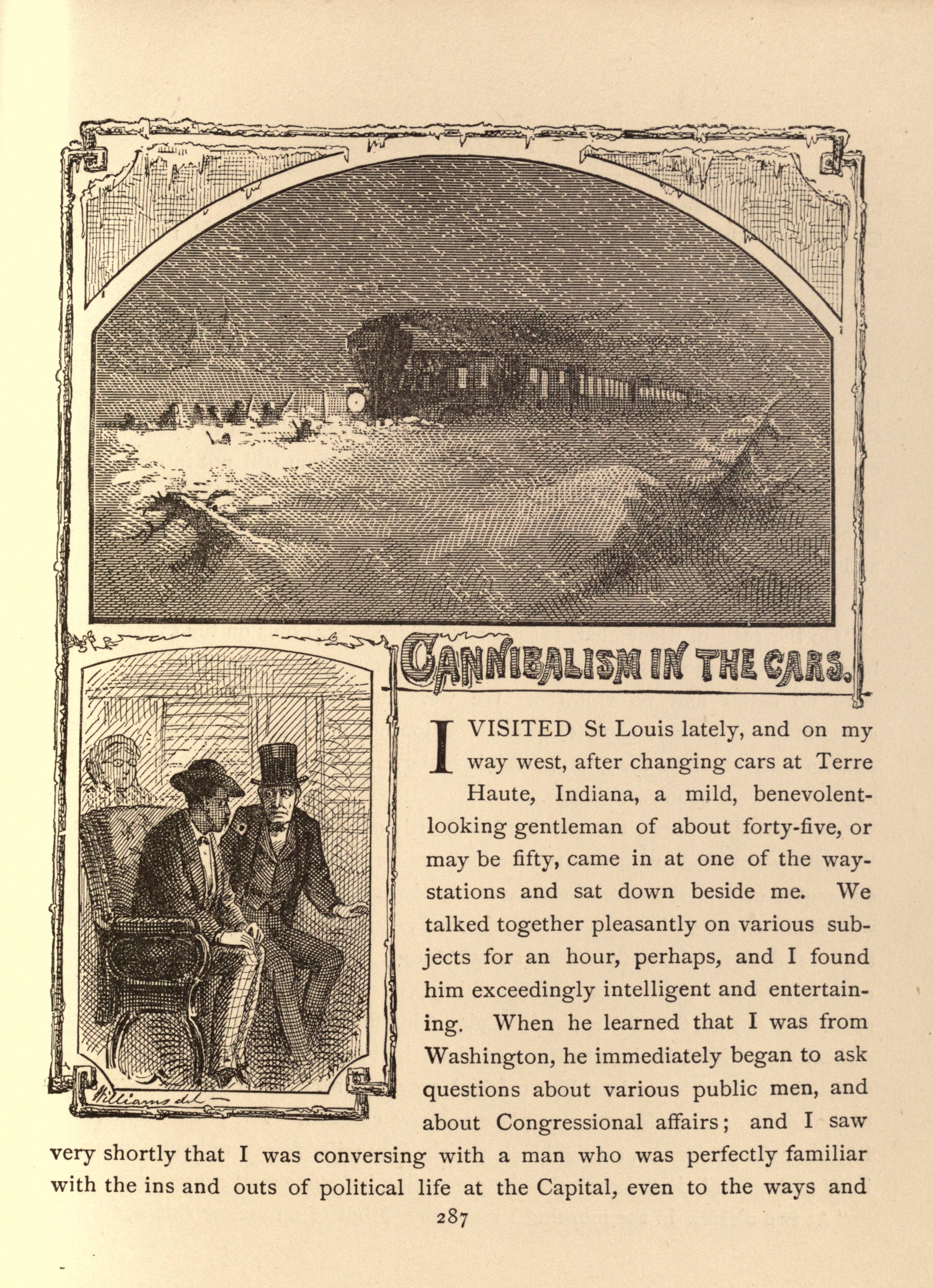
Sketches by Mark Twain

"Cannibalism in the Cars" is a short story written in 1868 by American writer Mark Twain. It tells the darkly humorous tale of apparent acts of cannibalism from the point of view of a congressman on a snowbound train. It indirectly satirizes the political system of the United States.

== Synopsis ==
An old man on a train tells the story of the aforementioned congressmen, trapped on a train during a snowstorm. It takes a week for the members of Congress to resign themselves to cannibalism for survival, whereupon they hold ineffective elections to select candidates (victims) and follow proper parliamentary procedure. For example: "Mr. Harris was elected, all voting for him but himself. It was then moved that his election should be ratified by acclamation, which was lost, in consequence of his again voting against himself".

The humor of the short story then becomes darker: "After breakfast we elected a man by the name of Walker, from Detroit, for supper. He was very good. I wrote his wife so afterward. He was worthy of all praise. I shall always remember Walker. He was a little rare, but very good. And then the next morning we had Morgan of Alabama for breakfast. He was one of the finest men I ever sat down to—handsome, educated, refined, spoke several languages fluently—a perfect gentleman—he was a perfect gentleman, and singularly juicy".

Having finished his story, the old man departs the train, but the conductor clarifies to the shocked listener: "He was a member of congress once, and a good one. But he got caught in a snowdrift in the cars, and like to have been starved to death. He got so frostbitten and frozen up generally, and used up for want of something to eat, that he was sick and out of his head two or three months afterward. He is all right now, only he is a monomaniac, and when he gets on that old subject he never stops till he has eat up that whole carload of people he talks about".

== Analysis ==
The story uses wordplay to raise to the foreground the latent double meanings that accompany political discourse. It is framed as a secondhand story heard by another train rider, with the narrator using the vernacular and mannerisms of a politician rather than a common man. The conclusion of the story leaves open to interpretation whether the narrator's tale of cannibalism was a fabrication.

== Publication history ==
It was first published in November 1868 in The Broadway Annual literary magazine, and later included in Sketches, New and Old (1875) and other collections, including The Oxford Book of American Short Stories, edited by Joyce Carol Oates (1992).
