= Sketches New and Old =

1875 short story collection by Mark Twain

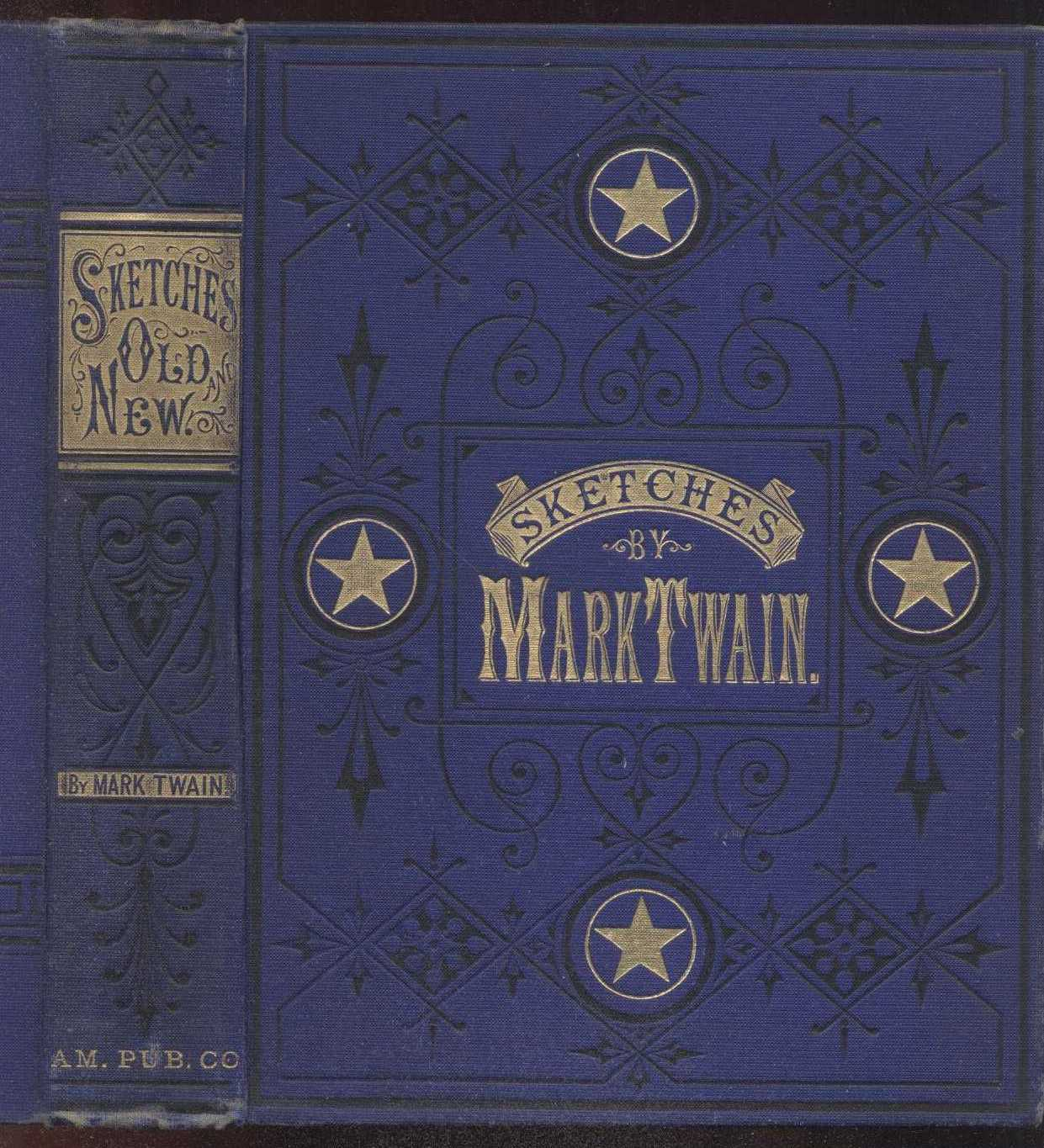
First edition

Sketches New and Old is a collection of short stories by Mark Twain. It was published in 1875. All the stories are fictional except for "The Case of George Fisher." It includes the short story "A Ghost Story", among others.

== Contents ==
- "Preface"
- "My Watch"
- "Political Economy"
- "The Jumping Frog"
- "Journalism in Tennessee"
- "The Story of the Bad Little Boy"
- "The Story of the Good Little Boy"
- "A Couple of Poems by Twain and Moore"
- "Niagara"
- "Answers to Correspondents"
- "To Raise Poultry"
- "Experience of the McWilliamses with Membranous Croup"
- "My First Literary Venture"
- "How the Author Was Sold in Newark"
- "The Office Bore"
- "Johnny Greer"
- "The Facts in the Case of the Great Beef Contract"
- "The Case of George Fisher"
- "Disgraceful Persecution of a Boy"
- "The Judges 'Spirited Woman'"
- "Information Wanted"
- "Some Learned Fables, for Good Old Boys and Girls"
- "My Late Senatorial Secretaryship"
- "A Fashion Item"
- "Riley-Newspaper Correspondent"
- "A Fine Old Man"
- "Science vs. Luck"
- "The Late Benjamin Franklin"
- "Mr. Bloke's Item"
- "A Medieval Romance"
- "Petition Concerning Copyright"
- "After-Dinner Speech"
- "Lionizing Murderers"
- "A New Crime"
- "A Curious Dream"
- "A True Story"
- "The Siamese Twins"
- "Speech at the Scottish Banquet in London"
- "A Ghost Story"
- "The Capitoline Venus"
- "Speech on Accident Insurance"
- "John Chinaman in New York"
- "How I Edited an Agricultural Paper"
- "The Petrified Man"
- "My Bloody Massacre"
- "The Undertaker's Chat"
- "Concerning Chambermaids"
- "Aurelia's Unfortunate Young Man"
- "'After' Jenkins"
- "About Barbers"
- "'Party Cries' in Ireland"
- "The Facts Concerning the Recent Resignation"
- "History Repeats Itself"
- "Honored as a Curiosity"
- "First Interview with Artemus Ward"
- "Cannibalism in the Cars"
- "The Killing of Julius Caesar 'Localized'"
- "The Widow's Protest"
- "The Scriptual Panoramist"
- "Curing a Cold"
- "A Curious Pleasure Excursion"
- "Running for Governor"
- "A Mysterious Visit"
