= Puxian opera =

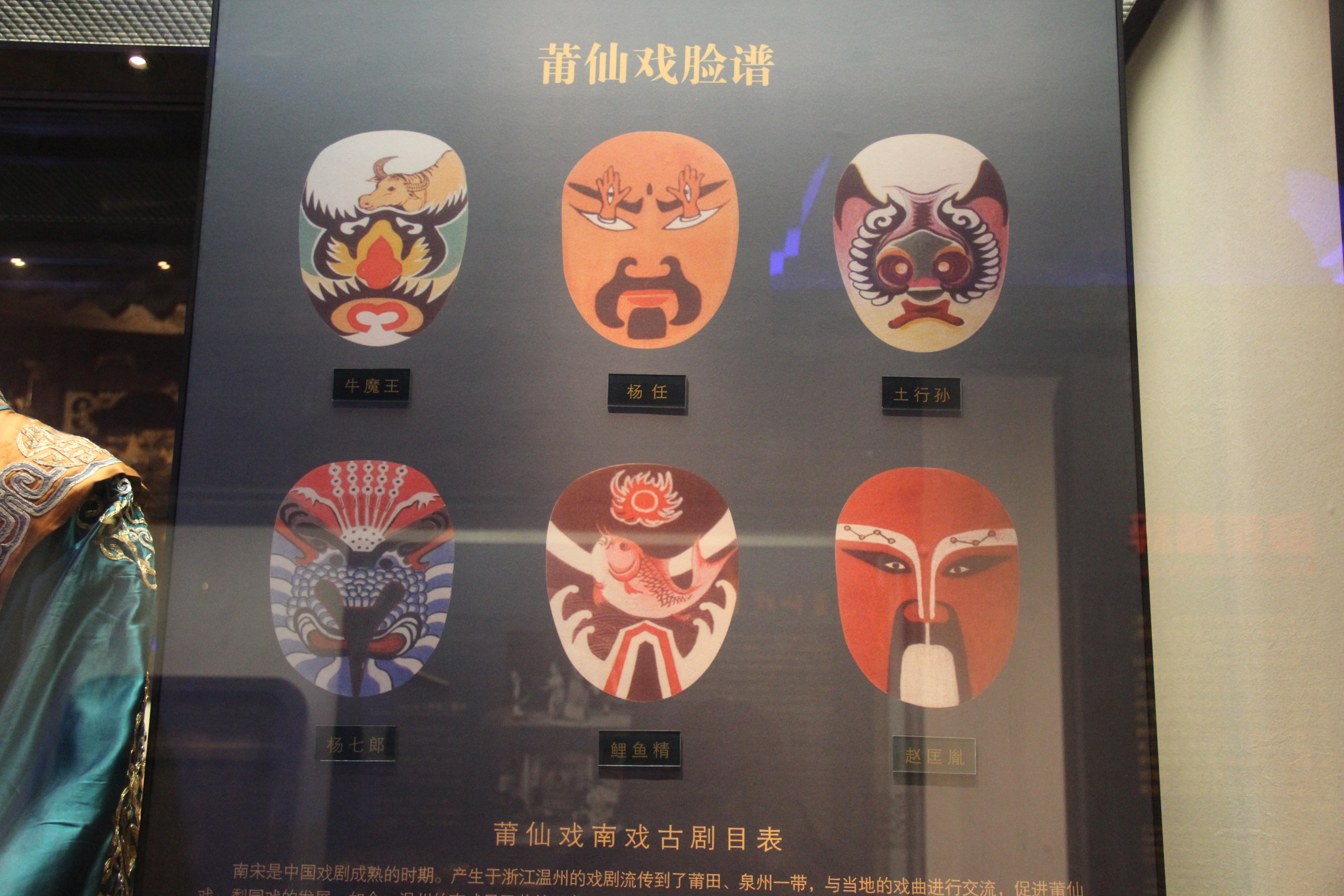
Examples of Puxian opera mask designs.

Puxian opera (Hinghwa Romanized: Pó-sing-hi̍;traditional Chinese: 莆仙戲; simplified Chinese: 莆仙戏), also known as Xinghua opera (Hinghwa Romanized: Hing-hua̍-hi̍;traditional Chinese: 興化戲; simplified Chinese: 兴化戏) or Hinghwa opera, is a variety of Chinese opera from Putian, Fujian province, China. It enjoys a good popularity in Putian, but is endangered just like Puxian Min and other Chinese operas.
