= Jinxiang ting =

The opening of the novel Jinxiang ting

Jinxiang ting (traditional Chinese: 錦香亭; simplified Chinese: 锦香亭) or Jinxiang ting zhuan (traditional Chinese: 錦香亭傳; simplified Chinese: 锦香亭传), translated into English as Jinxiang Pavilion, the Pavilion of Brocade and Aroma and several other translated titles, (Note: Other English translated titles of the novel include Pavilion of Embroidered Fragrance and a few others.) is a Chinese romantic novel of the caizi jiaren genre from the late 17th-century to the early 18th-century. Its authorship is ascribed to a writer named Su An Zhu Ren (素庵主人) or Gu Wu Su An Zhu Ren (古吳素庵主人), which is a pseudonym.

Cover of Jinxiang ting, from the National Library of China

Title page of the novel

Pages from chapter three of the novel
