= Qi County, Kaifeng =

Qi County 杞县
- County
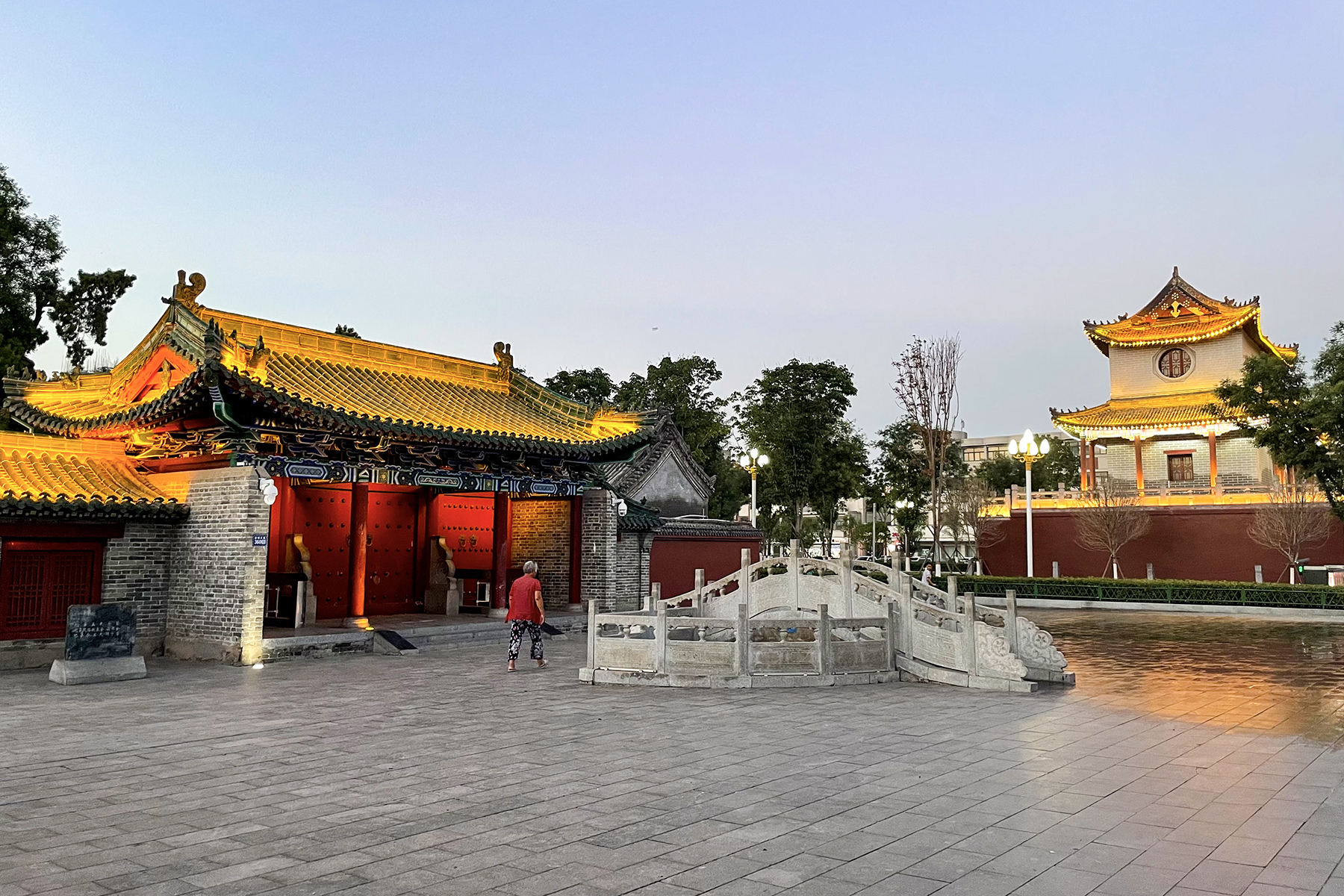

- Location of the seat in Henan
- Coordinates: 34°32′56″N 114°46′59″E
- Country: People's Republic of China
- Province: Henan
- Prefecture-level city: Kaifeng
- County seat: Chengguan (城关镇)

Area
  - Total: 1,258 km^{2} (486 sq mi)

Population (2019)
  - Total: 895,600
  - Density: 711.9/km^{2} (1,844/sq mi)
- Time zone: UTC+8 (China Standard)
- Postal code: 475200
- Area code: 0371
- Website: zgqx.gov.cn

Qi County or Qixian (simplified Chinese: 杞县; traditional Chinese: 杞縣; pinyin: Qǐ Xiàn) is a county of Kaifeng, Henan, People's Republic of China, with an area of 1243 square km and a population of 1.05 million.

== History ==
From Shang to Western Zhou, Qi County was the place of the State of Qi. In Qin dynasty, Qi was named as Yongqiu (Chinese: 雍丘). It was the site of the Battle of Yongqiu in 756. In the Song dynasty, Yongqiu was renamed to Qi. Cai Wenji, a Han dynasty poet and composer, was born shortly before 178 in Yu Prefecture (圉縣), Chenliu Commandery (陳留), in what is now Qi County, Kaifeng, Henan.

== Administrative divisions ==
Qi County has 8 towns and 13 townships.

Towns

- Chengguan (城关镇), Wulihe (五里河镇), Fuji (付集镇), Yuzhen (于镇镇), Gaoyang (高阳镇), Gegang (葛岗镇), Yanggu (阳固镇), Xingkou (邢口镇)

Townships

- Peicundian (裴村店乡), Zongdian (宗店乡), Banmu (板木乡), Zhulin (竹林乡), Guanzhuang (官庄乡), Hugang (湖岗乡), Sumu (苏木乡), Shahuo (沙活乡), Pingcheng (平城乡), Nigou (泥沟乡), Shiyuan (柿元乡), Xizhai (西寨乡), Chengjiao (城郊乡)

== Climate ==
Climate data for Qixian, elevation 60 m (200 ft), (1991–2020 normals, extremes 1981–2010)
Month	Jan	Feb	Mar	Apr	May	Jun	Jul	Aug	Sep	Oct	Nov	Dec	Year
Record high °C (°F)	17.8 (64.0)	24.2 (75.6)	27.1 (80.8)	32.3 (90.1)	37.6 (99.7)	39.8 (103.6)	38.7 (101.7)	37.1 (98.8)	35.7 (96.3)	34.8 (94.6)	27.3 (81.1)	20.4 (68.7)	39.8 (103.6)
Mean daily maximum °C (°F)	5.4 (41.7)	9.4 (48.9)	15.1 (59.2)	21.4 (70.5)	26.9 (80.4)	31.8 (89.2)	32.1 (89.8)	30.7 (87.3)	27.1 (80.8)	21.9 (71.4)	14.0 (57.2)	7.4 (45.3)	20.3 (68.5)
Daily mean °C (°F)	0.4 (32.7)	3.8 (38.8)	9.3 (48.7)	15.4 (59.7)	20.9 (69.6)	25.8 (78.4)	27.3 (81.1)	25.9 (78.6)	21.4 (70.5)	15.7 (60.3)	8.5 (47.3)	2.3 (36.1)	14.7 (58.5)
Mean daily minimum °C (°F)	−3.3 (26.1)	−0.4 (31.3)	4.4 (39.9)	10.0 (50.0)	15.5 (59.9)	20.5 (68.9)	23.4 (74.1)	22.2 (72.0)	17.0 (62.6)	10.9 (51.6)	4.2 (39.6)	−1.4 (29.5)	10.3 (50.5)
Record low °C (°F)	−15.2 (4.6)	−14.0 (6.8)	−6.8 (19.8)	−2.9 (26.8)	3.8 (38.8)	12.2 (54.0)	16.5 (61.7)	12.0 (53.6)	5.6 (42.1)	−1.9 (28.6)	−11.3 (11.7)	−13.8 (7.2)	−15.2 (4.6)
Average precipitation mm (inches)	11.4 (0.45)	15.9 (0.63)	21.4 (0.84)	37.3 (1.47)	62.3 (2.45)	79.6 (3.13)	145.5 (5.73)	142.3 (5.60)	70.9 (2.79)	38.5 (1.52)	30.2 (1.19)	11.3 (0.44)	666.6 (26.24)
Average precipitation days (≥ 0.1 mm)	4.1	4.1	4.9	5.4	6.8	7.5	10.7	10.0	7.9	5.7	5.1	3.5	75.7
Average snowy days	3.5	2.7	1.1	0.1	0	0	0	0	0	0	0.9	2.3	10.6
Average relative humidity (%)	65	64	63	67	69	67	81	84	78	71	70	67	71
Mean monthly sunshine hours	119.0	129.5	170.0	196.6	211.9	194.1	176.9	167.0	154.7	153.2	135.2	123.5	1,931.6
Percentage possible sunshine	38	42	46	50	49	45	40	41	42	44	44	40	43
Source: China Meteorological Administration

== Notable people ==
- Cai Yong (132–192), musician and calligrapher of the Han dynasty.
- Cai Wenji (177--?), poet and composer of the Han dynasty, Cai Yong's daughter.
- Mu Qing (1921–2003), journalist, author and photographer.
