= Mao Kun map =

Ming dynasty navigation charts

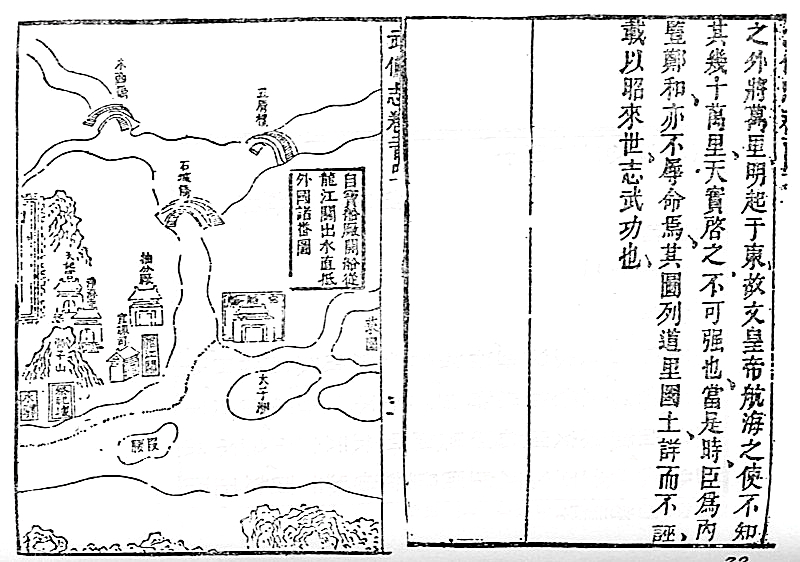
First page of the map with part of the introduction

Mao Kun map, usually referred to in modern Chinese sources as Zheng He's Navigation Map (traditional Chinese: 鄭和航海圖; simplified Chinese: 郑和航海图; pinyin: Zhèng Hé hánghǎi tú), is a set of navigation charts published in the Ming dynasty military treatise Wubei Zhi. The book was compiled by Mao Yuanyi in 1621 and published in 1628; the name of the map refers to his grandfather Mao Kun from whose library the map is likely to have originated. The map is often regarded as a surviving document from the expeditions of Zheng He in addition to accounts written by Zheng's officers, such as Yingya Shenglan by Ma Huan and Xingcha Shenglan by Fei Xin. It is the earliest known Chinese map to give an adequate representation of Southern Asia, Persia, Arabia and East Africa.

== Origin ==
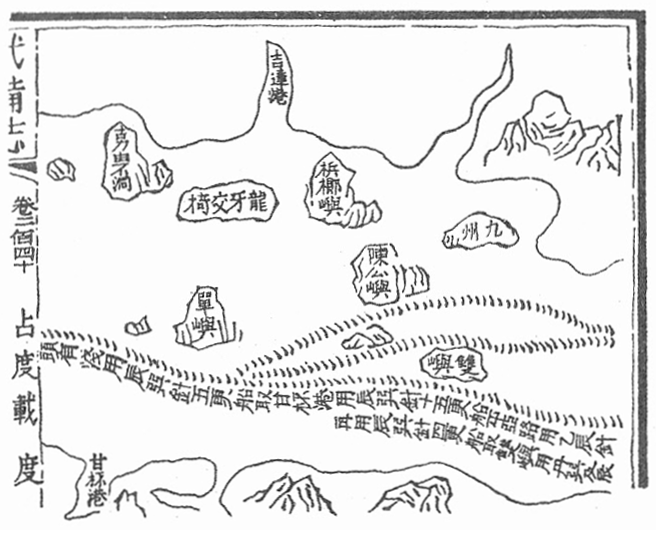
Part of Mao Kun map showing passage through the Strait of Malacca

The map is thought by sinologist J.J.L. Duyvendak to have been part of the library of Mao Kun, a collector of military and naval material, who might have acquired it while he was the governor of Fujian. The map was included in Wubei Zhi edited by his grandson Mao Yuanyi, and therefore had been referred to in the past as the "Wubei Zhi chart". In order to distinguish it from other maps in Wubei Zhi, the map was named after Mao Kun by Western scholars such as J. V. G. Mills who studied the map, and therefore came to be known as Mao Kun map in Western sources.

The introduction to the map in Wubei Zhi indicates that the geographical and navigational details of the charts are based on works from the expeditions of Zheng He, and that Mao had "inserted them for the information of posterity and as a memento of [Zheng He's] military achievement". (Note: Original text: 當是時，臣為內豎鄭和，亦不辱命. 焉，其圖列道里國土，詳而不誣，載以昭來世，志武功也。) The map is therefore generally considered to be based on maps dating to the time of Zheng He's voyages, and accordingly named as Zheng He's Navigation Map in modern Chinese sources.

According to Mills, the map may not have been the work of a single person, rather it was produced in an office with information added and corrected when new information became available after each voyage. He suggested that this map may have been prepared for the 6th expedition in 1421, with some content added during the course of the expedition, and that the map may, therefore, be dated to around 1422. Others proposed a date sometime between 1423 and 1430. It has also been suggested by J.J.L. Duyvendak and Paul Pelliot that the map may have been partly based on Arab nautical charts.

== Format and content ==
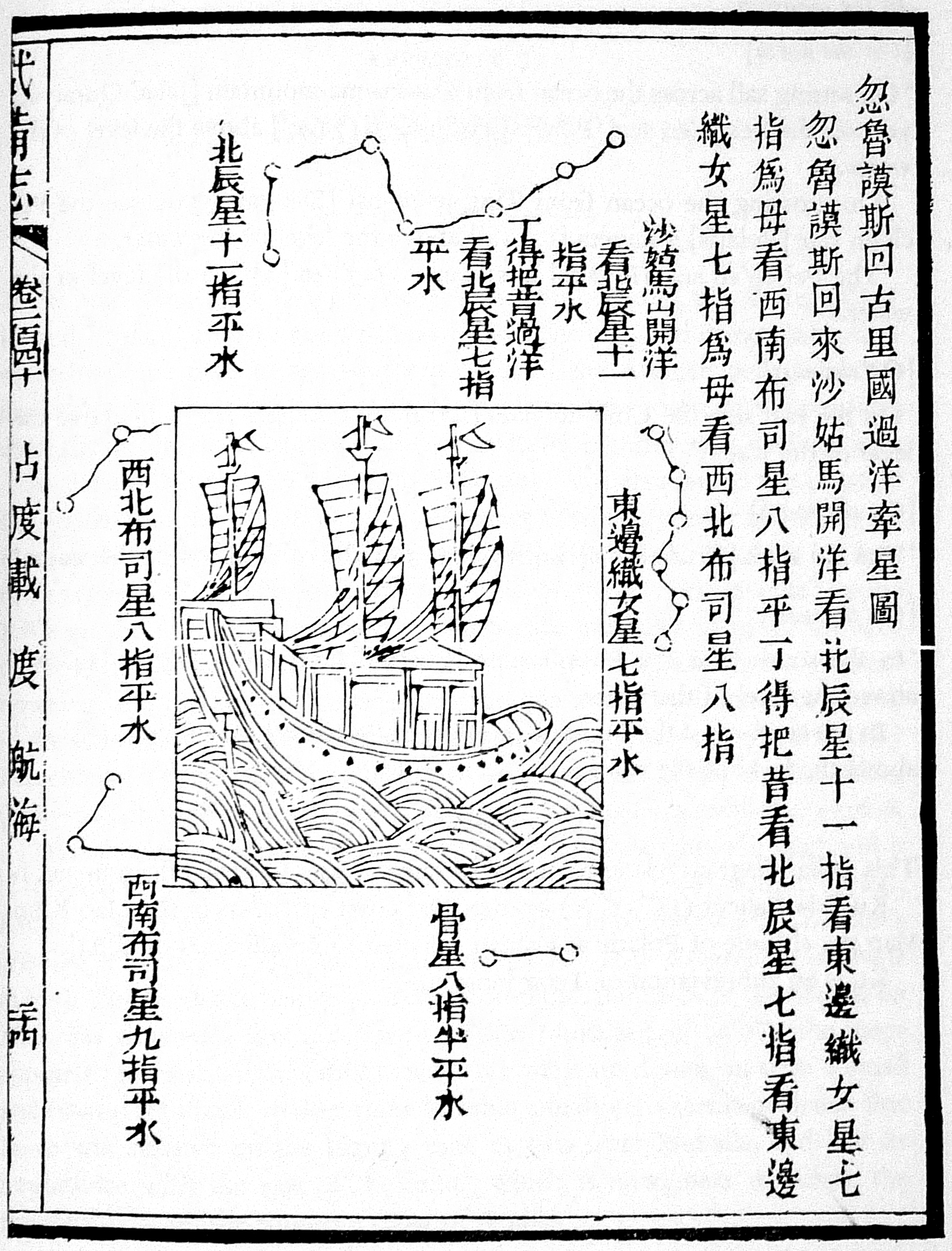
Stellar diagram with instructions for navigation from Hormuz to Calicut

The map was originally in the form of a strip map of 20.5 cm by 560 cm that could be rolled up, but was then divided into 40 pages in the book. The map, after Nanjing and the Yangtze River, shows mainly the coastal regions and islands along the sea route, and places are depicted in their approximate positions along the contour of the coast. The coast of the main land mass is shown largely as a continuous irregular line at the top of the map, with deep V-shaped indentations indicating river estuaries. As a result of the nature of the map and its focus on the coastal region, the shape of the Malay Peninsula cannot be distinguished, and India became elongated as its interior is omitted. Pages of the map are arranged from right to left in traditional Chinese book format, starting from Nanjing and finishing in Hormuz. Places in East Africa such as Socotra, Mogadishu and Malindi appear in sequence from left to right on the coast of Africa which is shown as a continuous land mass at the bottom of the sections for India and Sri Lanka.

Also marked on the map as dotted lines are sailing routes, with instructions given along the route markings. The sailing instructions are given in compass points and distances – the compass point uses a 24-point compass system with a Chinese character denoting each point (each point further subdivided into three), and the distance is expressed in Chinese units of time (each unit a 2.4-hour period) that would take account of the local currents and winds. Most of the instructions are only given in one direction, although occasionally both the outbound and homeward voyages may also be given. The instructions are also more detailed for Chinese waters. The latitude is indicated by the height of stellar constellation, a similar system to one used by Arabs. Four stellar diagrams are given at the end with instruction for positioning the ships in relation to the stars and constellations to ensure correct navigation in two passages – between Sumatra and Sri Lanka, and between Hormuz and Calicut.

The map does not attempt to give a true or consistent representation in its scale or orientation – the scale can vary from 7 miles/inch in the Nanjing area to 215 miles/inch along parts of the African coast, and in some parts, such as the page with Ceylon, it may orientate in several directions within the same page. There are also geographical distortions in the representation of some places such as Java, and the map becomes less complete the further west it goes. The structure of the last portion or most western of the chart suggests that it may have been composed from a number of other maps of varying scales, including one that was just for Sri Lanka, another for the Maldives and a third for the African Coast. Names of places appear to include Arabic terms (for example Jazirah for island) and may suggest Arab, Swahili or South Asian cartographic or geographic influences.

== Places on map ==
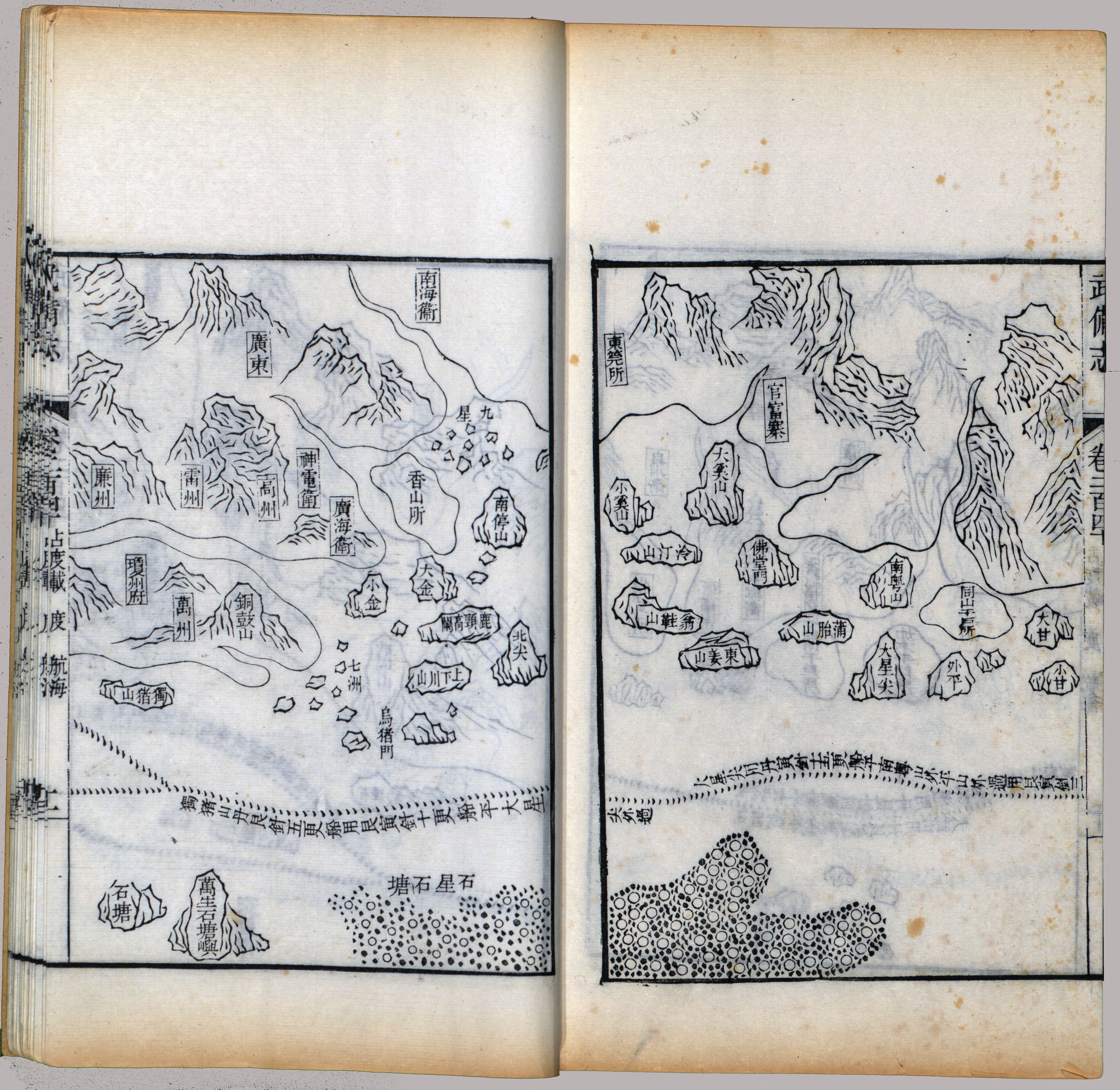
Mao Kun map showing the southern shores of South China, including groups of islands south of the map. Identification of these islands as the Paracel Islands, Macclesfield Bank or Spratly Islands varies with different authors.

There are 499 place names in the map, 423 of these have been identified by Mills, although some locations are identified differently by other authors. Some misprints have been noted, for example Barawa or Brava is given as shi-la-wa (十剌哇), with shi (十) substituting for bu (卜). There are also unexplained omissions of centers known to be active in the period, such as Nakhon Si Thammarat of Thailand. Some of the places may also have been located in the wrong position. Despite its imperfections, it is considered a map of some significance that provides valuable information to historians.

=== China ===
Almost half of the map (18 out of 40 pages) depicts the sailing route from Nanjing to the southern edge of China. The first few pages are on the Yangtze River. Of interest is the inclusion of what are interpreted as Paracel Islands, Macclesfield Bank or Spratly Islands – the names Shitang (石塘), Wansheng Shitangyu (萬生石塘嶼), and Shixing Shitang (石星石塘) are noted on the map, although identification of these islands may vary with different authors.

=== South East Asia ===
The map shows South East Asia in some details. Its main focus is on the route to the Western Ocean (西洋), a Chinese designation for the stretch of water starting from around Java or Sumatra to the Indian Ocean and beyond. This route from the South China Sea through the Strait of Malacca therefore shows greater details on the places of Indochina, the Malay Peninsula and Sumatra. The eastern fringe of the South China Sea, however, is not defined and with only Borneo and the Sulu Islands shown, and no navigation information on routes to the islands further east is given.

Among the places marked on the map are Zhanla (占羅, Cambodia), Champa (占城), Siam (暹羅, Thailand), Langkasuka (狼西加), Singapore (as Temasek, 淡馬錫), Malacca (滿剌加), Penang (梹榔嶼), Langkawi (龍牙交椅), Sumatra, and Kalimantan.

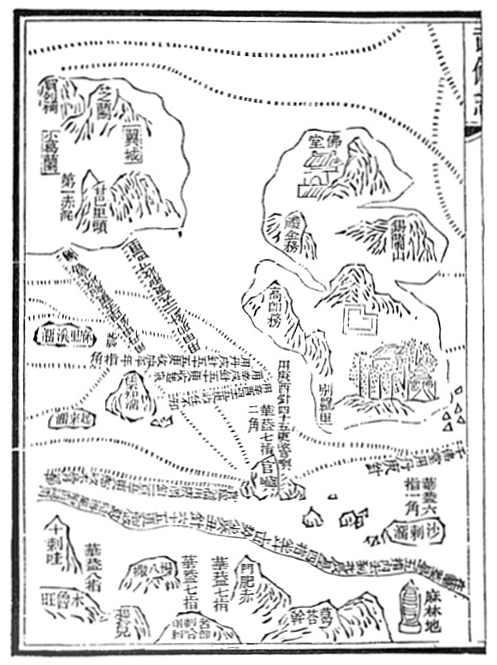
The island of Ceylon shown together with the east coast of Africa at the bottom. The Indian Ocean has been compressed.

=== South and West Asia ===
Some of the places marked include Bengal (榜葛剌), Orissa, Sri Lanka, Kollam, Calicut, Hormuz, Oman. Sri Lanka appears significantly larger than it actually is in relation to India. The chart also includes the major atolls of the Maldive Islands.

=== Africa ===
The east coast of Africa is shown in sections of the map with Sri Lanka and India with its land mass at the top of the map and the Maldives in the middle. Places such as Mombasa (慢八撒), Barawa (卜剌哇), and Mogadishu (木骨都束) are marked on the map. Other locations identified include Lamu Island, Manda Island, and Jubba and Marka in Somalia. What appears to be Malindi (麻林地) is shown in the wrong location to the right (or south) of Mombasa, and it had been suggested that this Malindi was meant to represent Mozambique or Kilwa Kisiwani in Tanzania. Another proposal is that this portion of the map represents only the Kenya Coast and that Malindi was the terminus of the journey. In this scenario the place previously thought to be Mombasa would actually be Faza or Mfasa on Pate Island, and that the order of the places on the map would be correct. This proposal also suggests that the Zheng He voyages never traveled more than six degrees south of the Equator, which would explain the omission of the important trading center of Kilwa in Southern Tanzania.

== Gallery ==
Mao Kun map

Arrangement in traditional Chinese format, to be read from right to left; first pages on top right, last pages on bottom left.

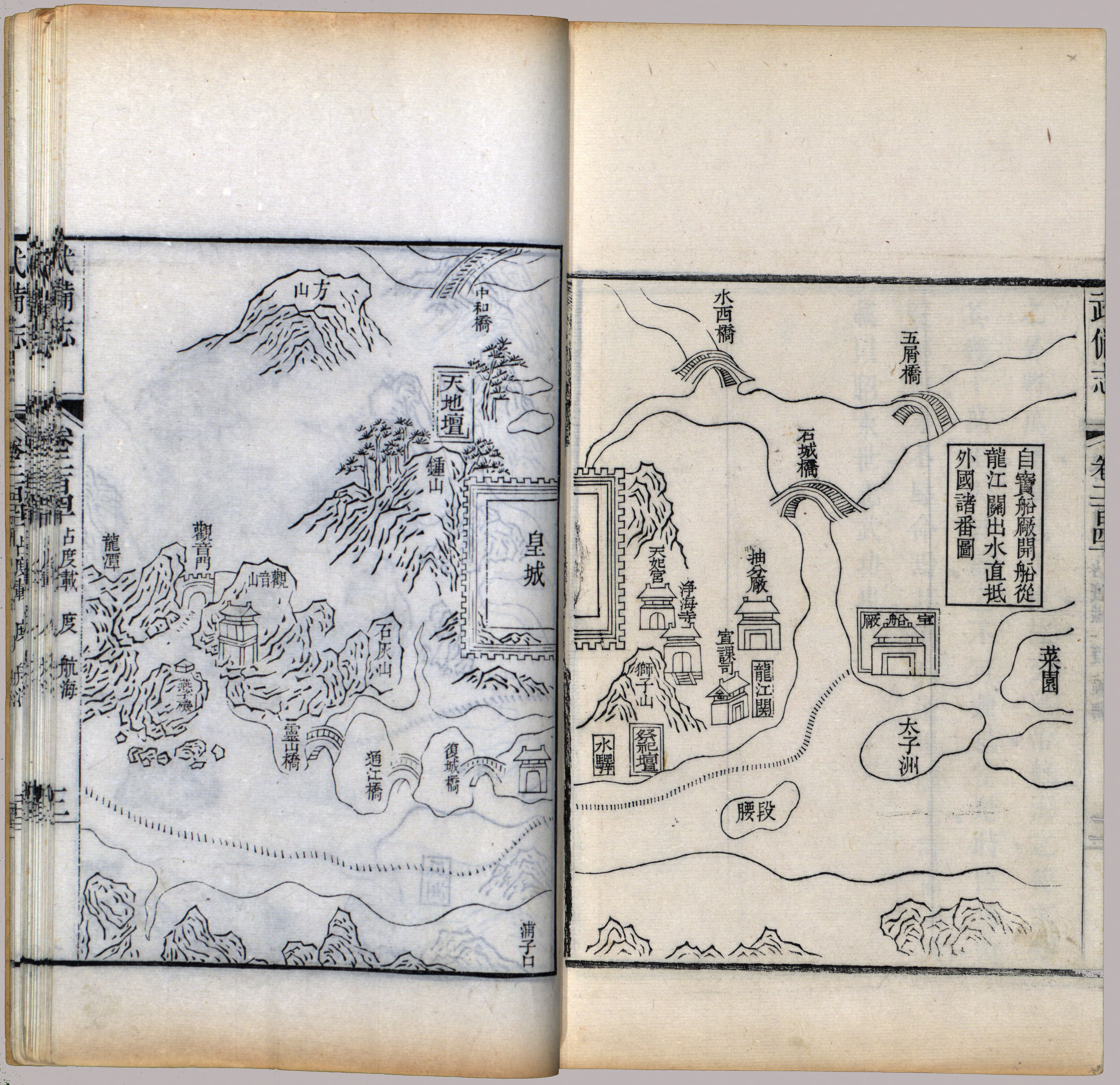

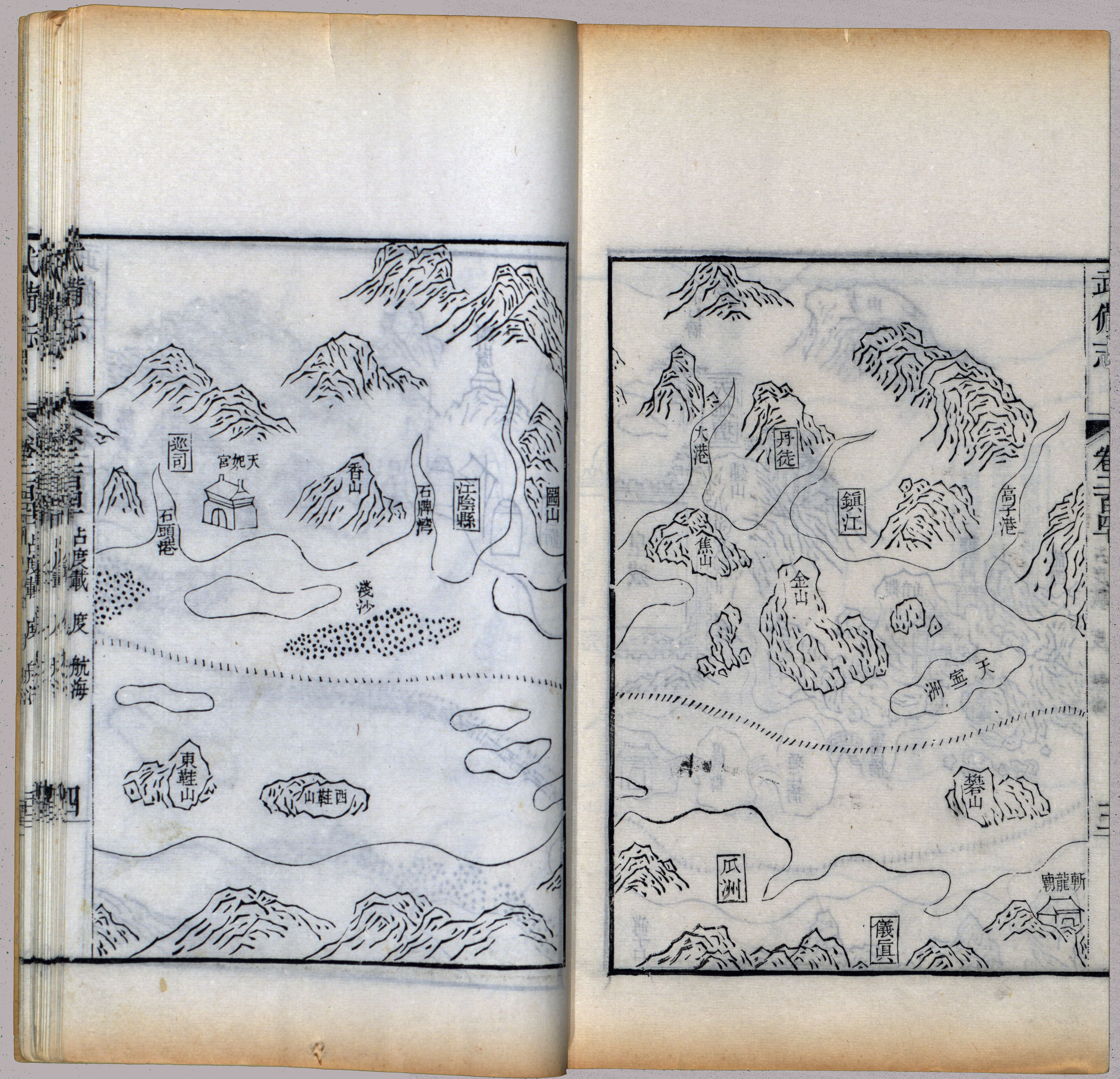

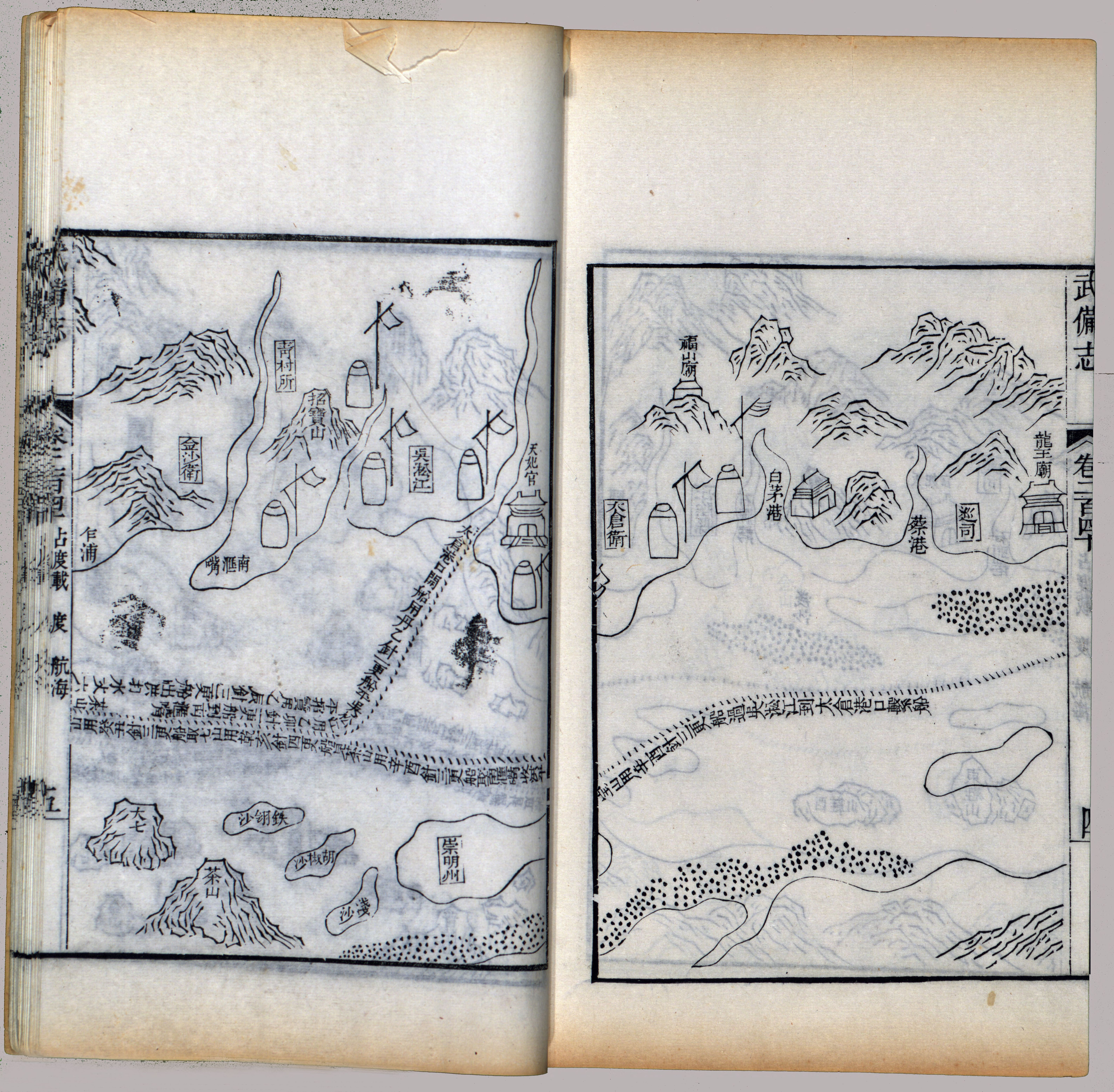

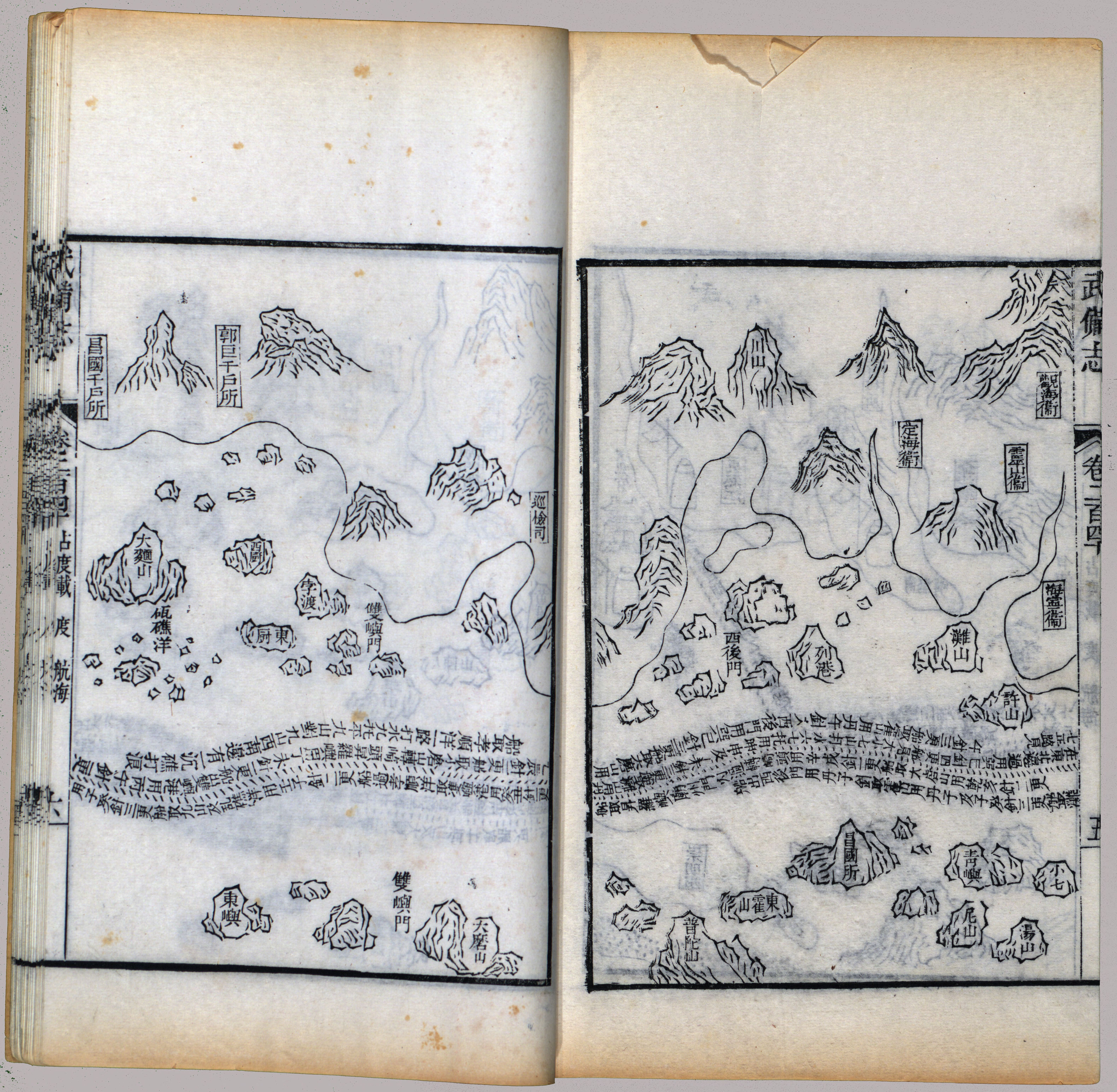

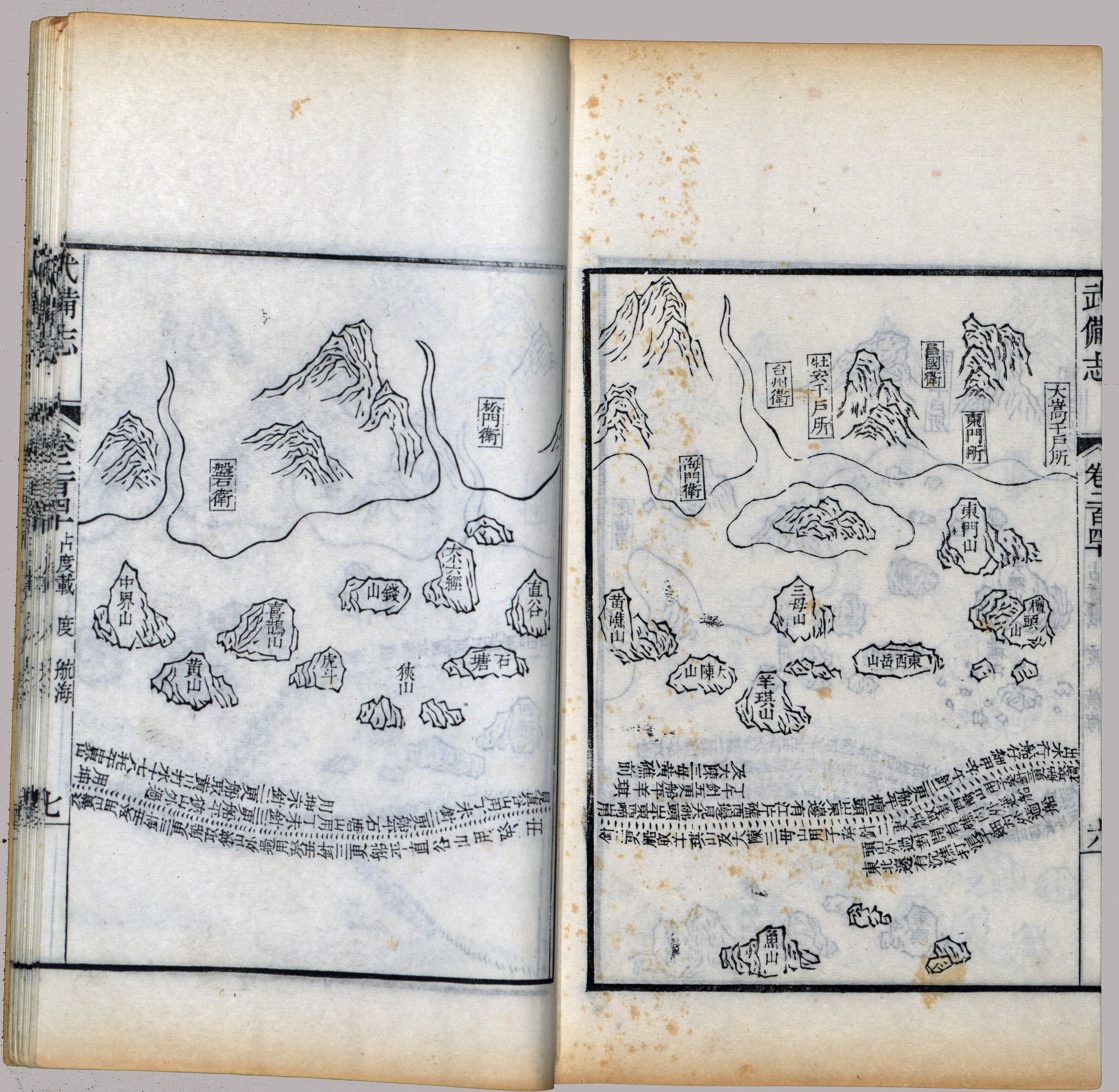

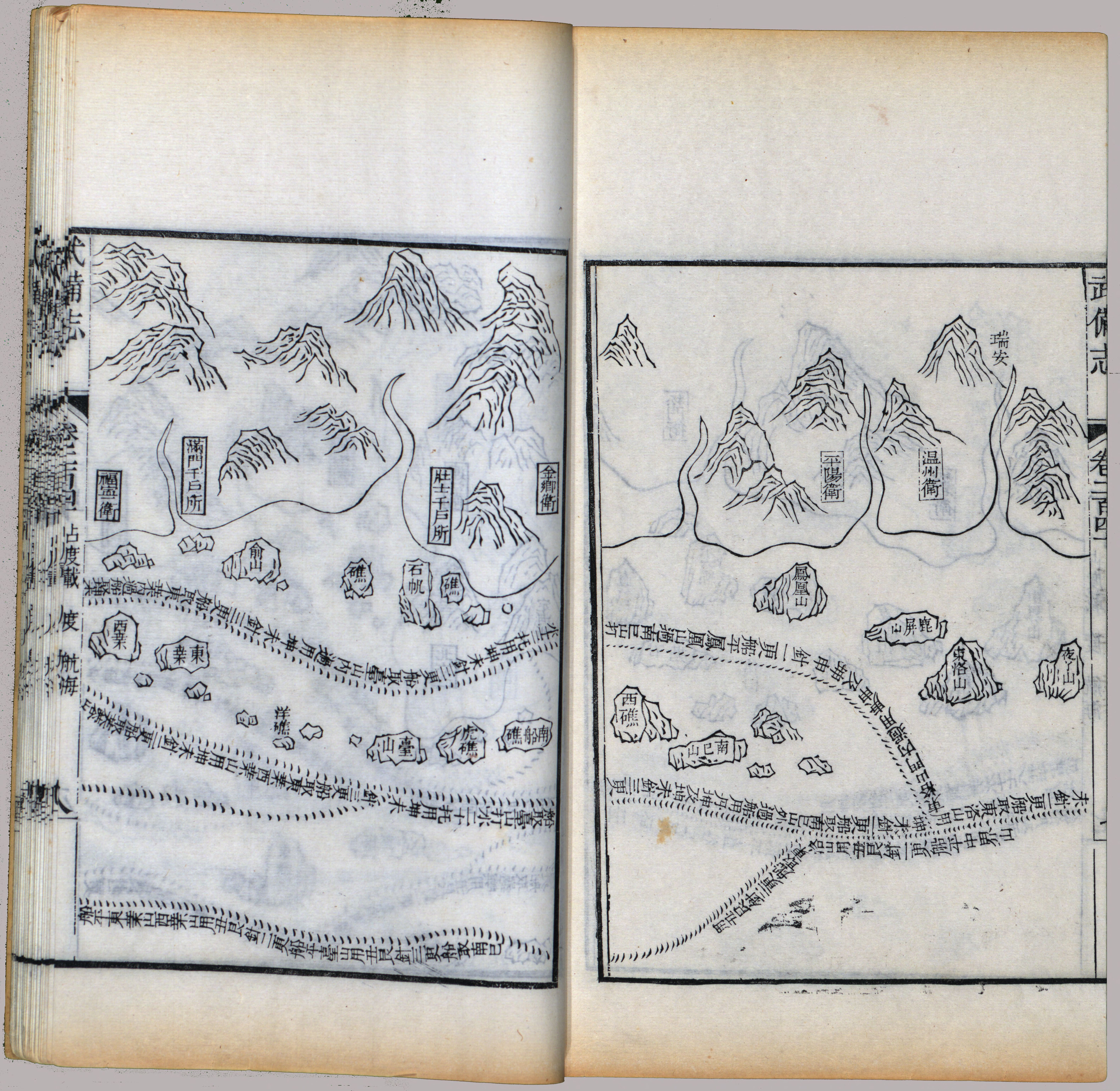

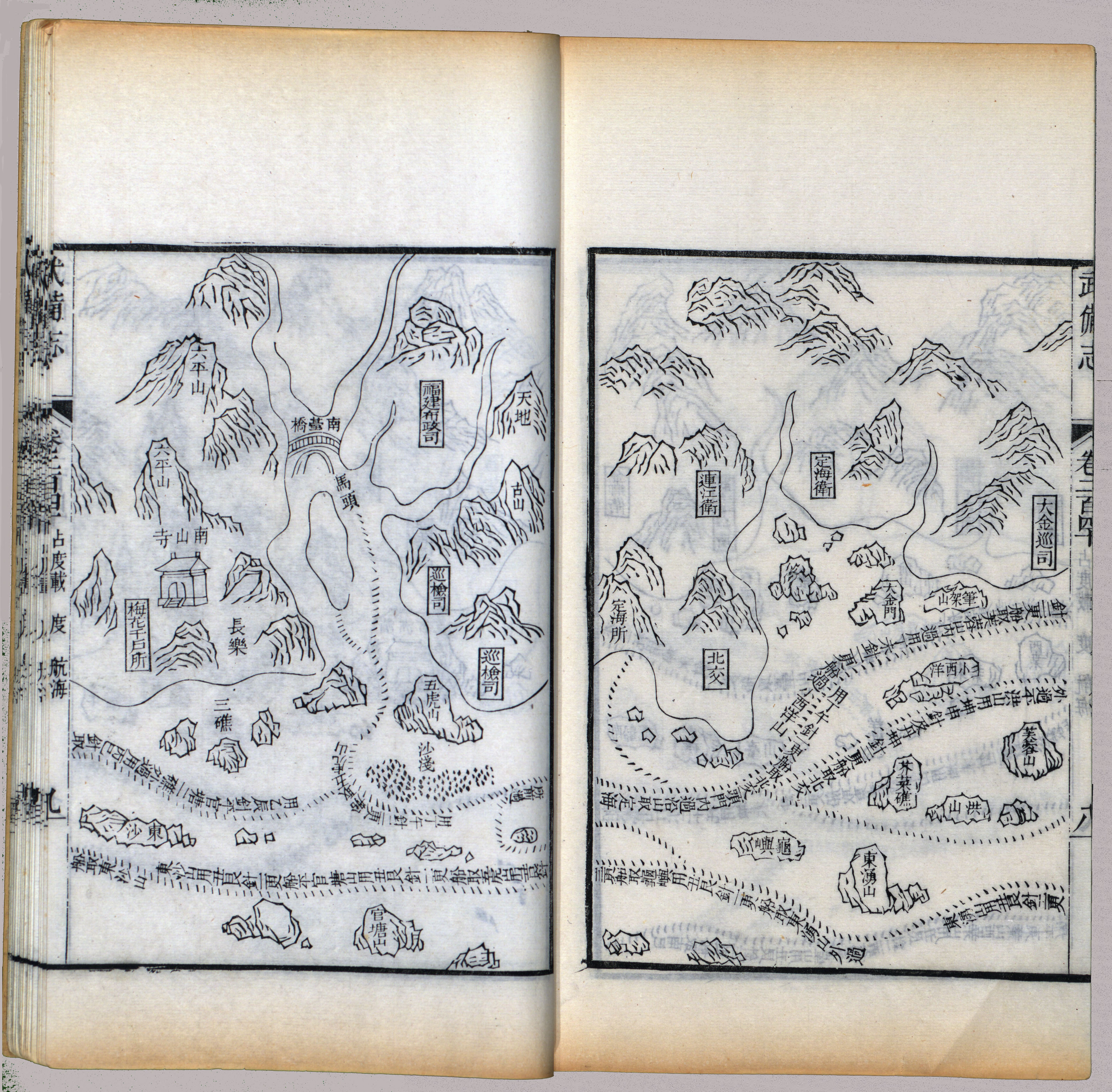

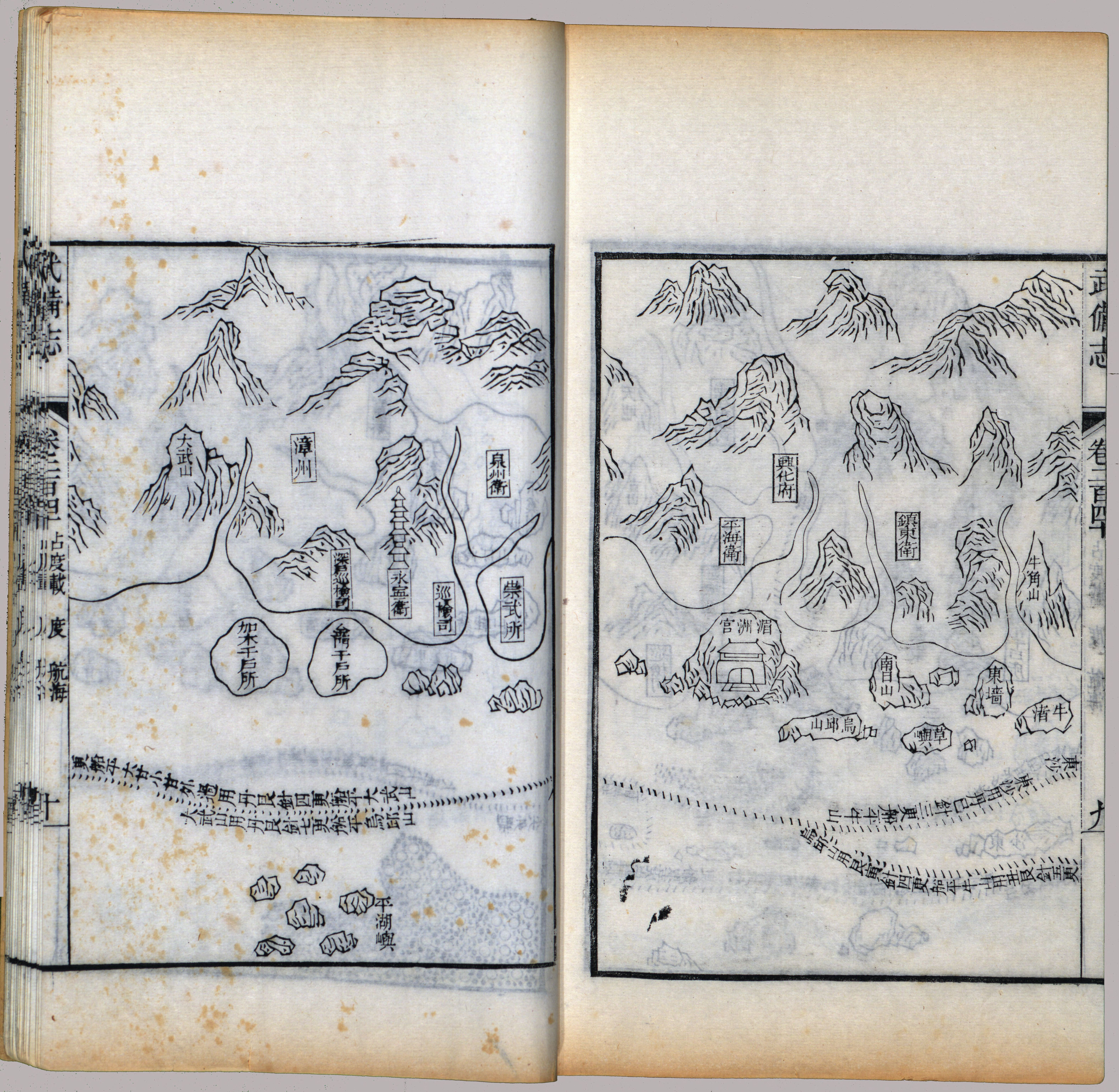

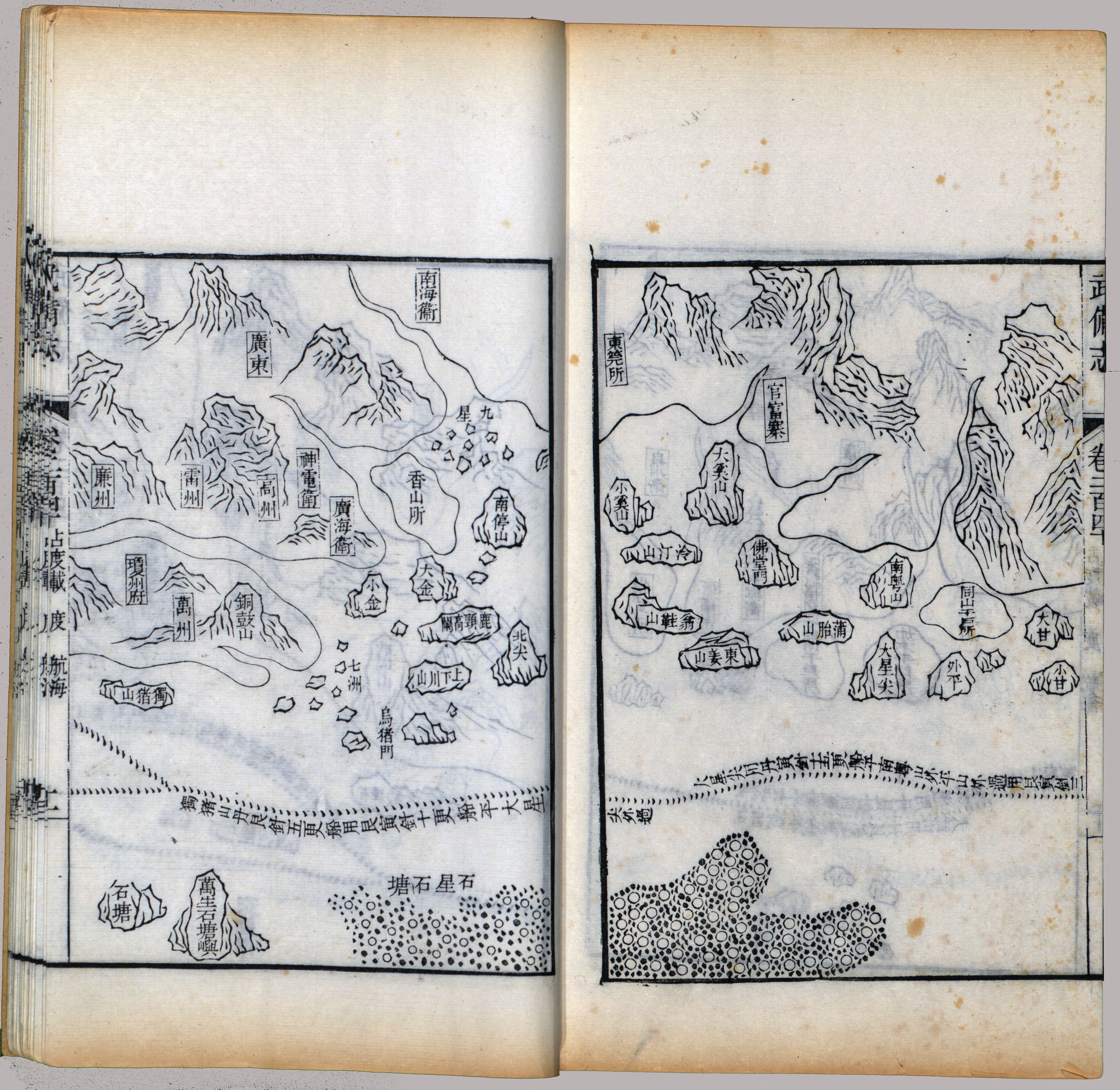

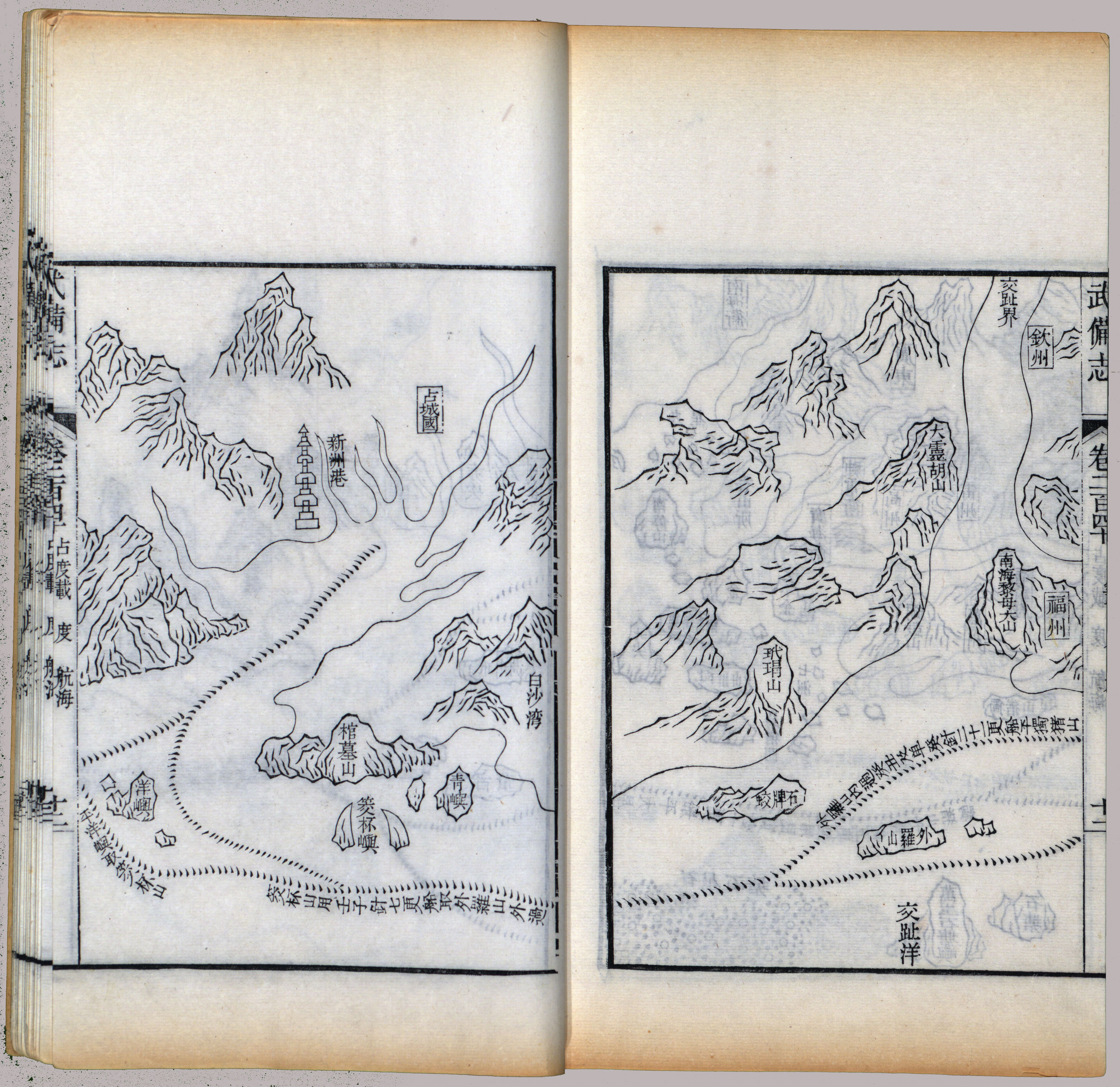

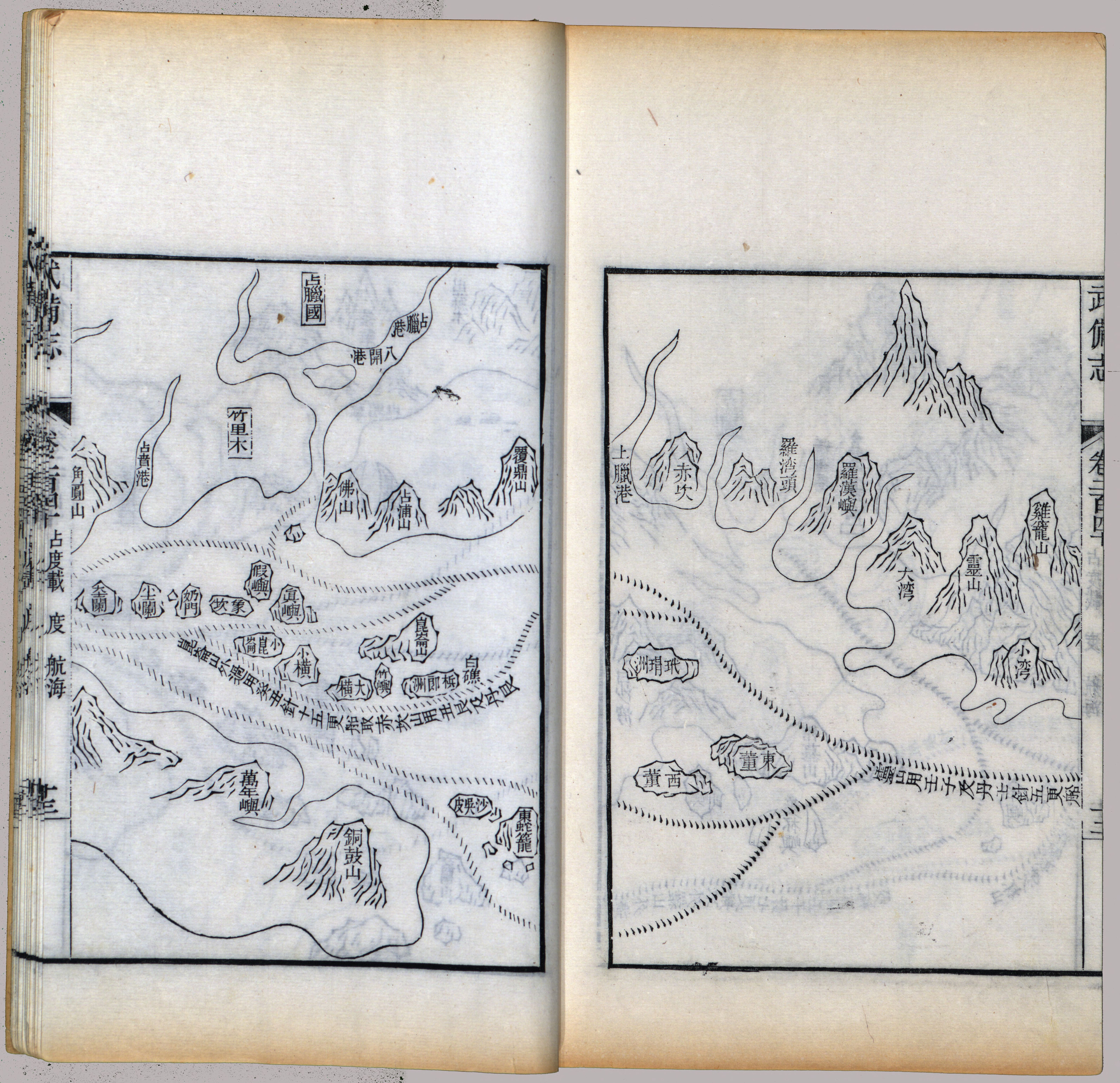

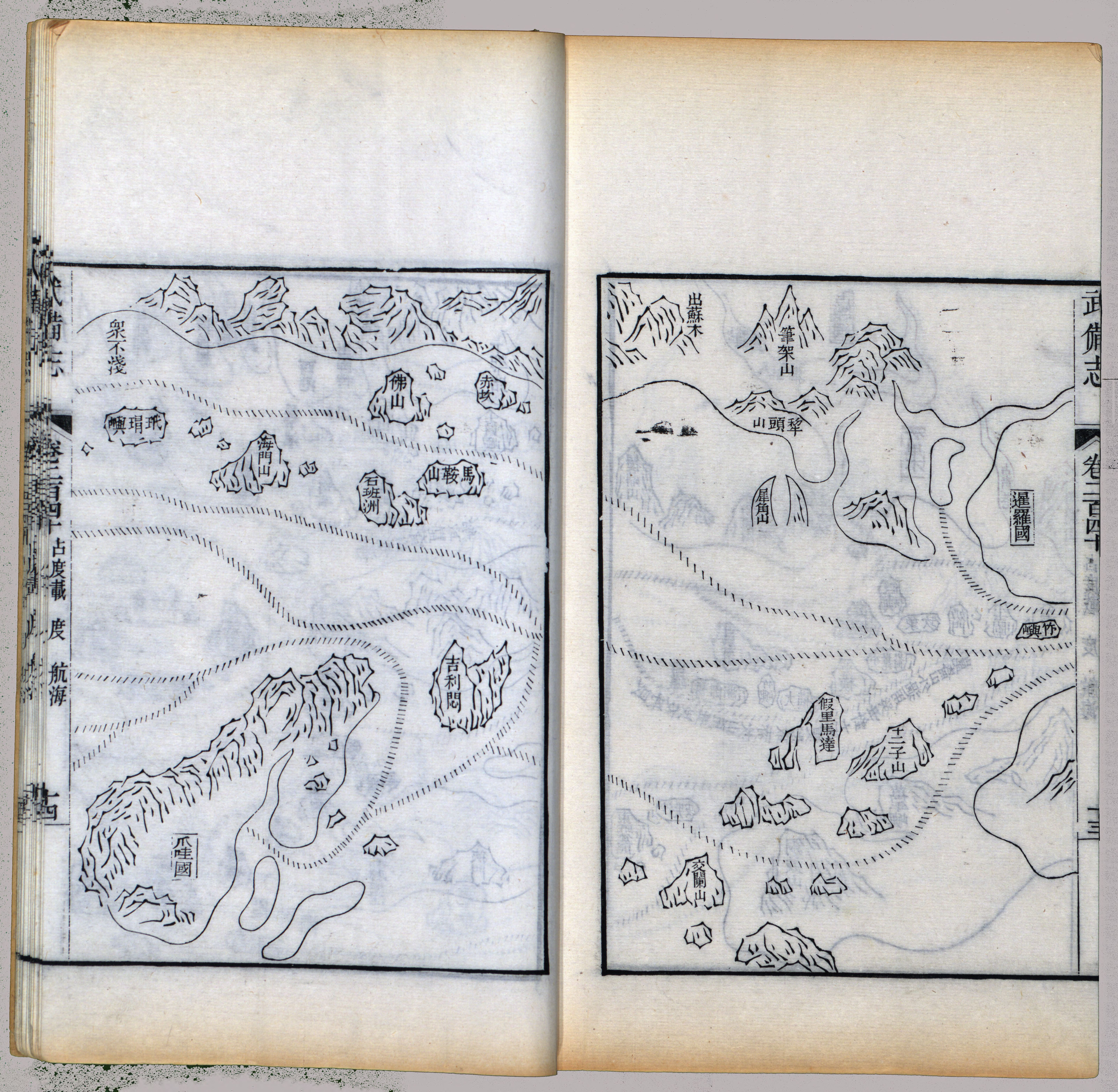

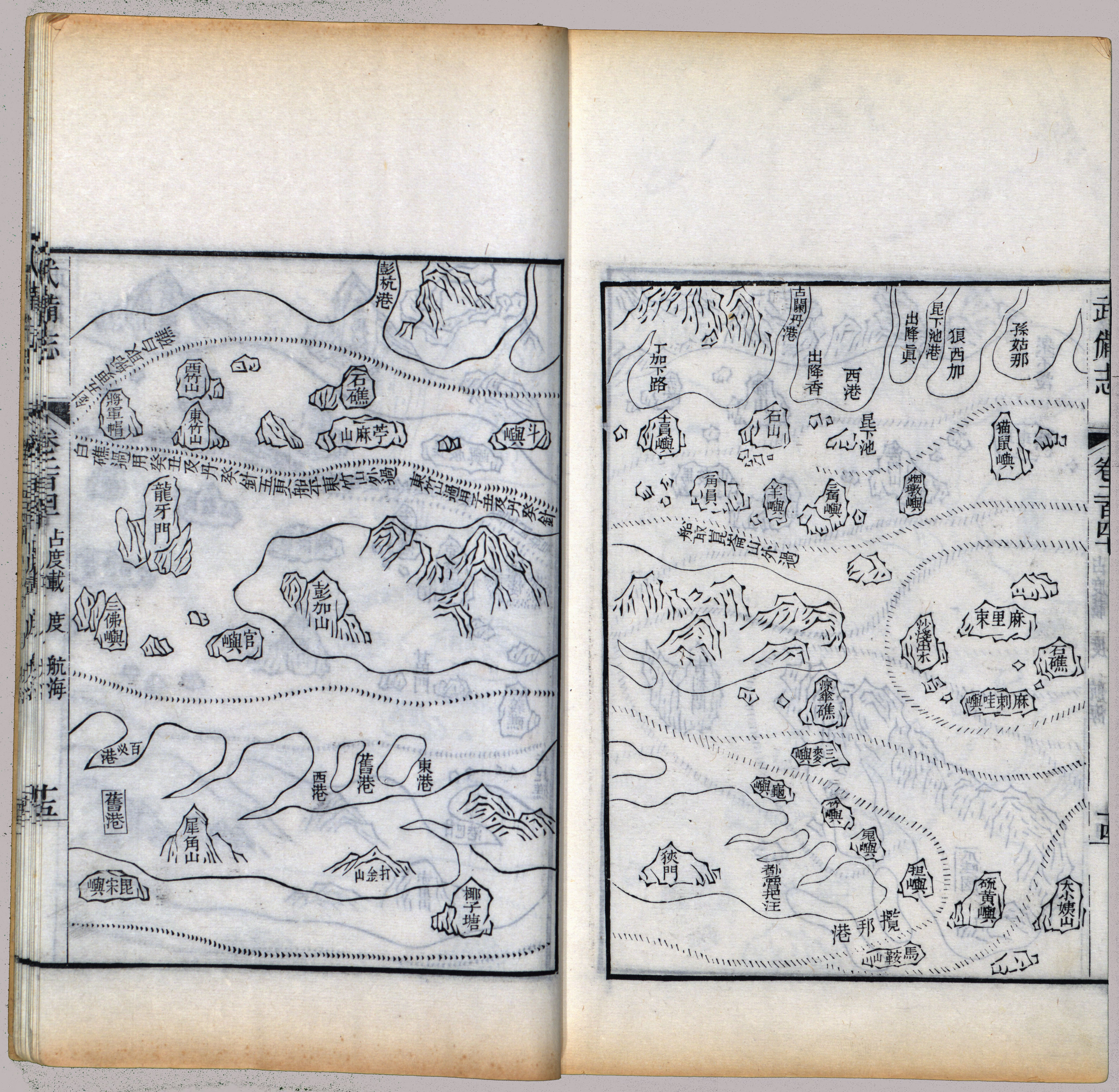

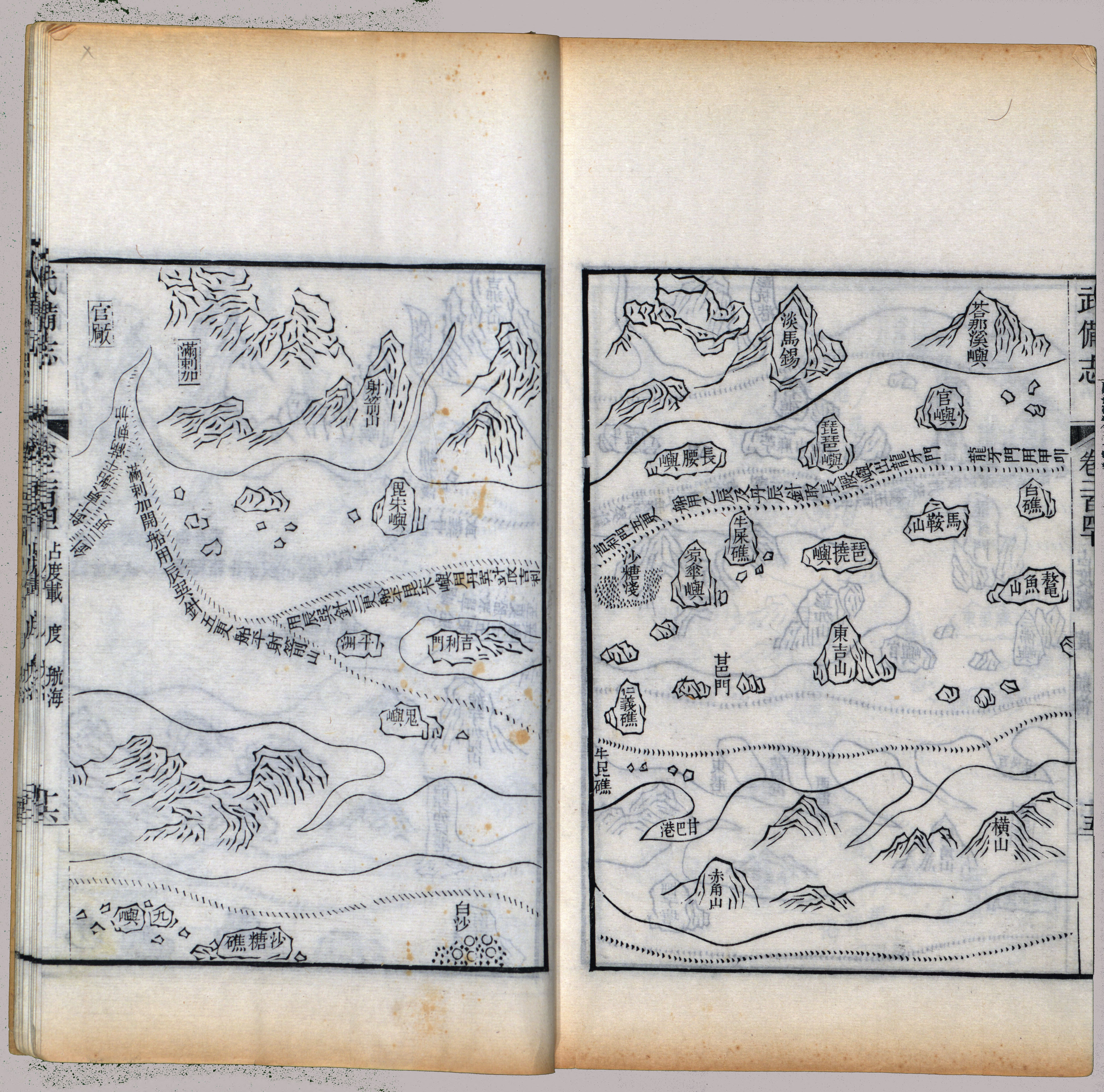

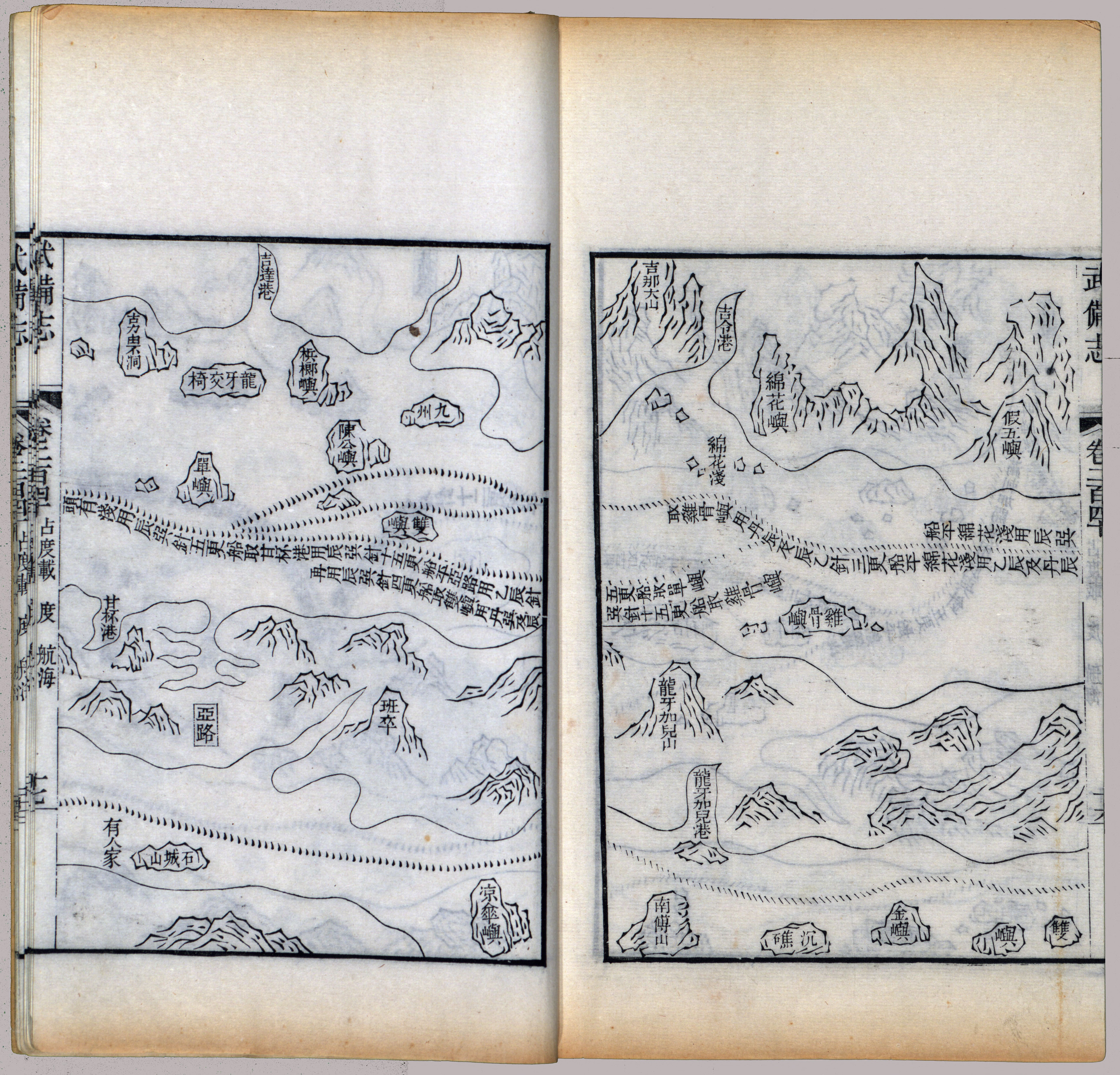

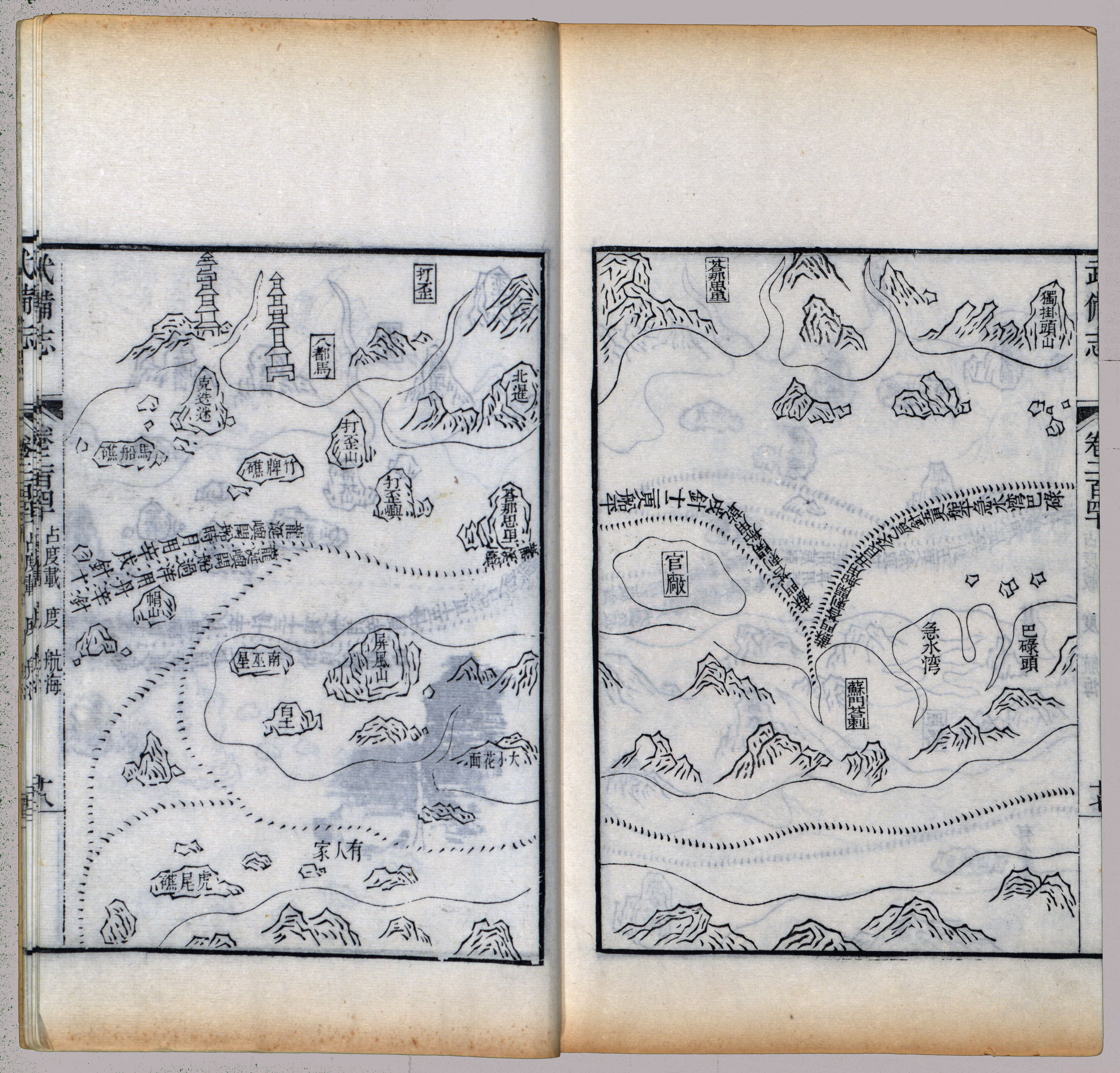

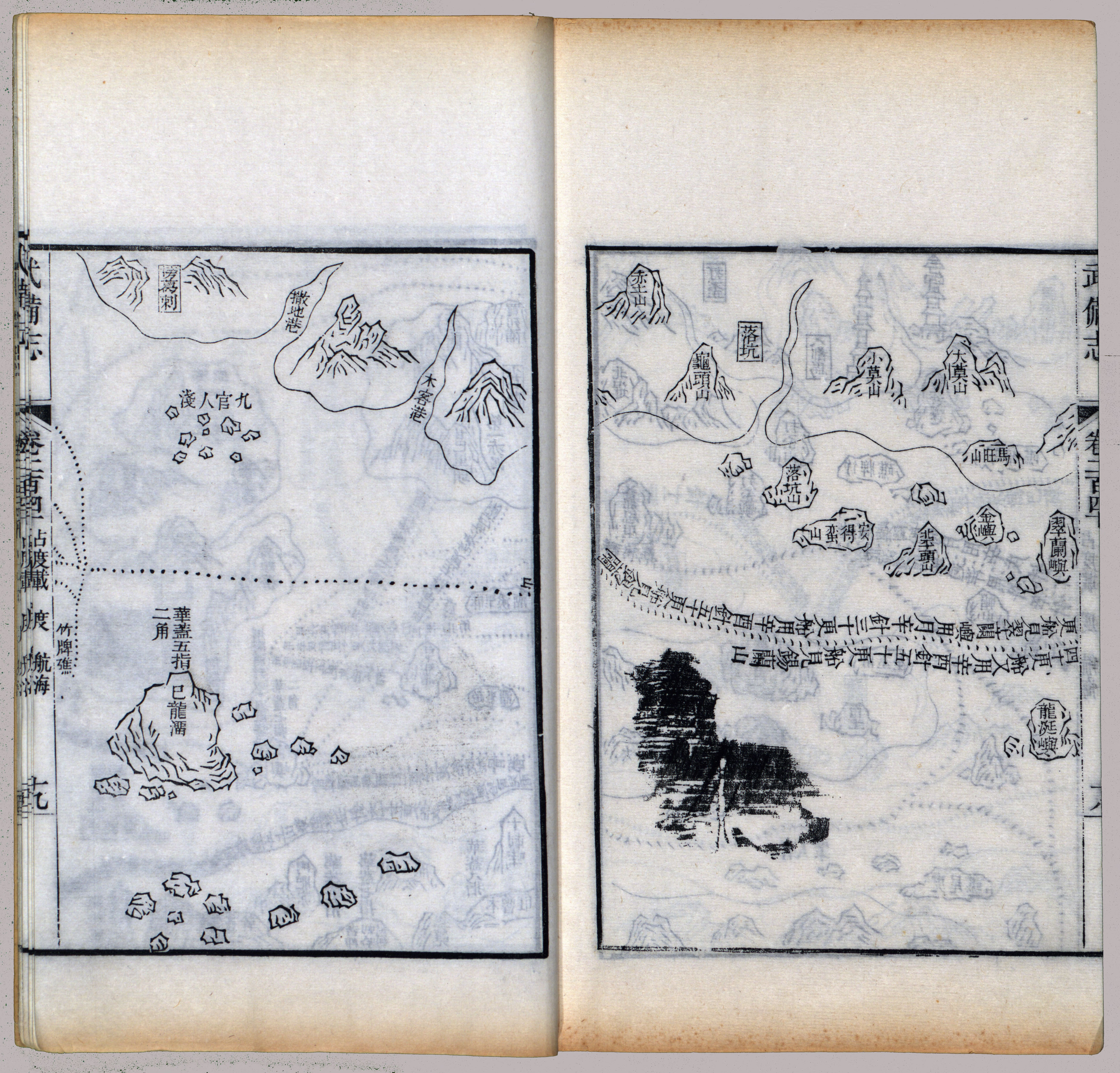

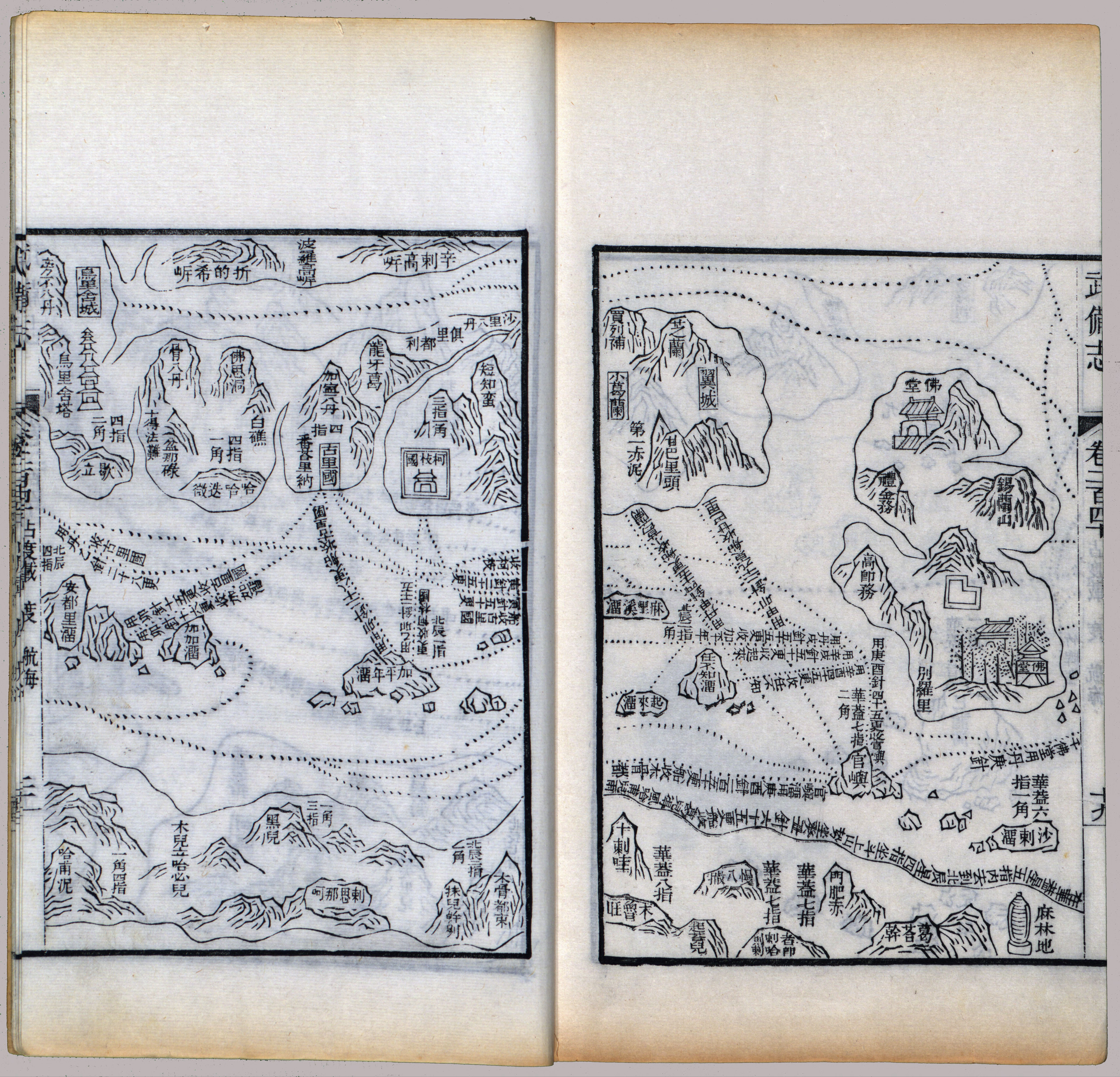

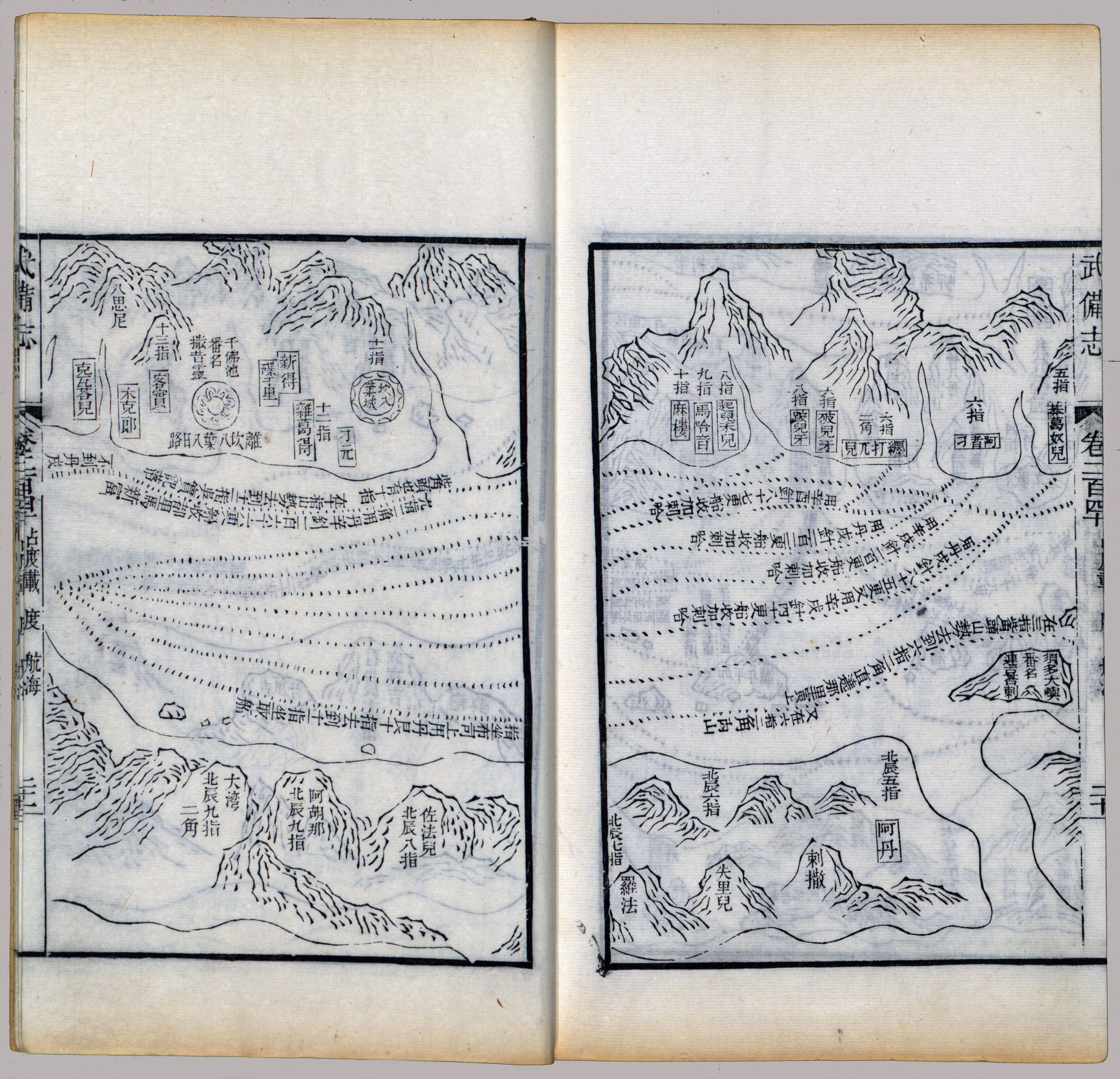

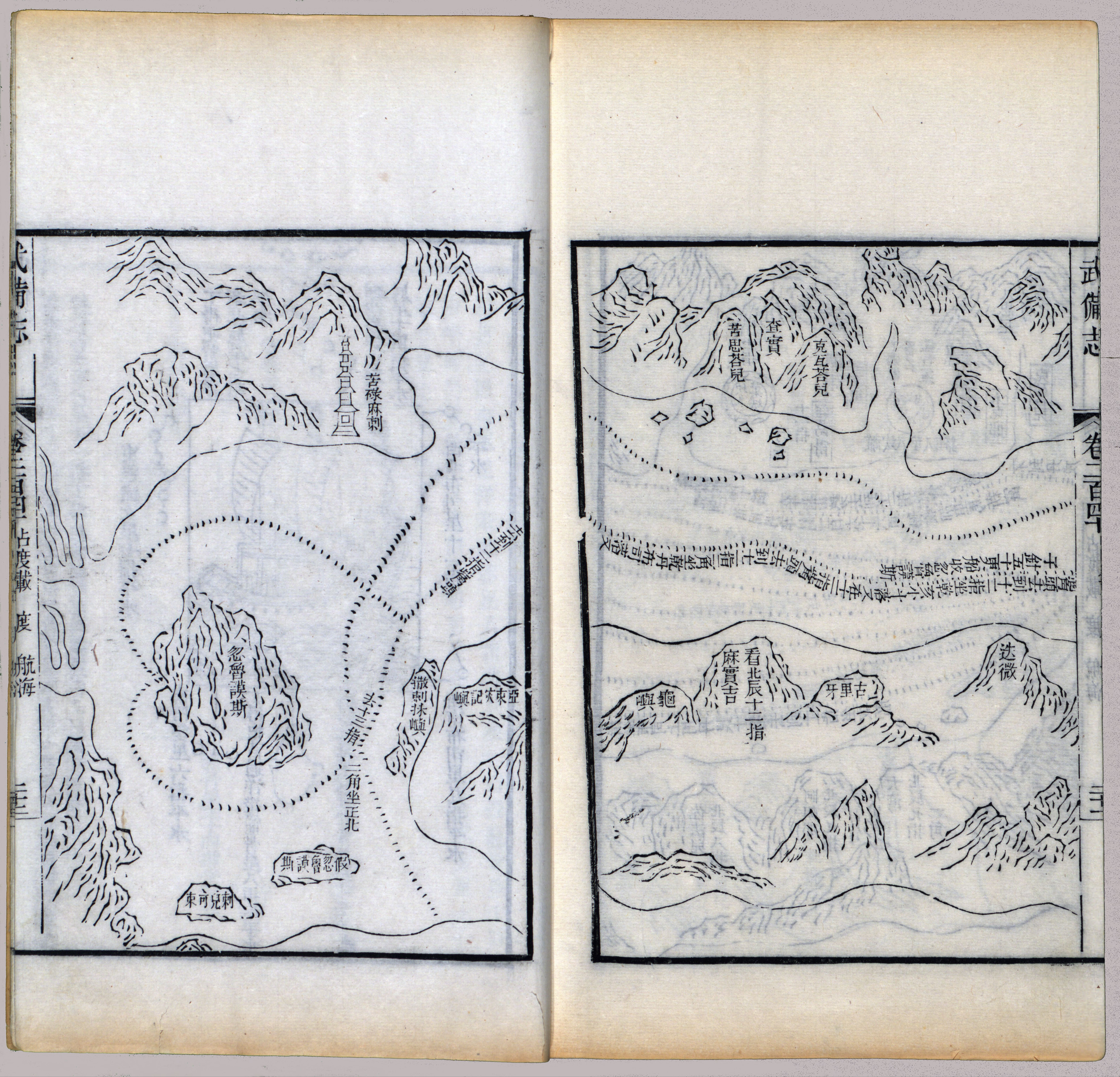

Stellar charts

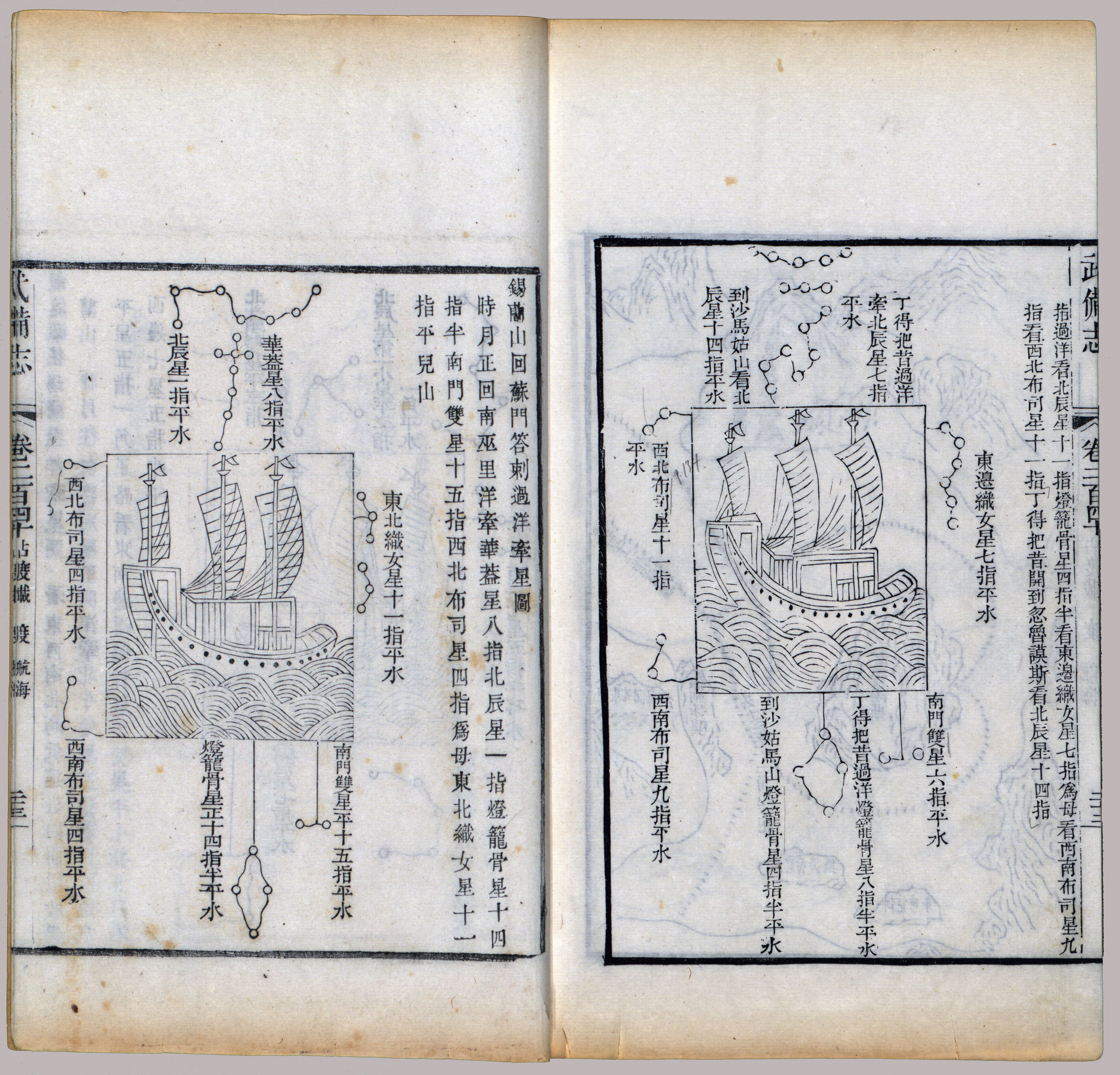

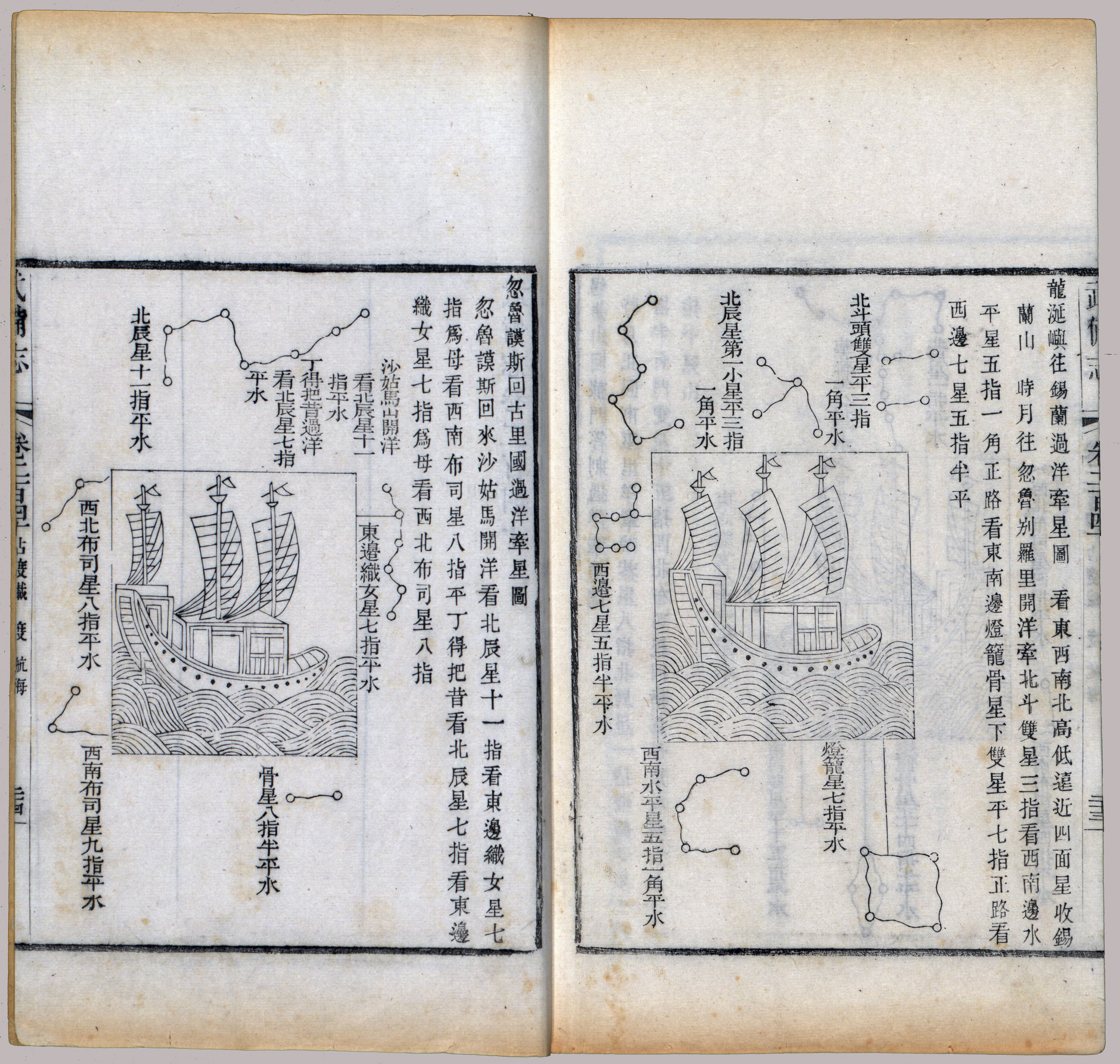

== Popular culture ==
The Pirates of the Caribbean franchise featured a map with circular rotating rings that led to spiritual realms and legends of the land beyond death. It uses meridian arcs, equatorial divisions, geographic landmarks and magic keys to guide one's spiritual passage. First introduced in At World's End, this map was presented as map of the character Sao Feng, and referred to as a Chinese allegory map, the navigational charts, the Map of the Land of the Dead or simply Sao Feng's Map in various media, while serving as the route to the Farthest Gate in the film. In an accompanying book for the following film, On Stranger Tides, the map was given the name Mao Kun Map though it was never said onscreen.

== See also ==
- History of Chinese cartography
- Cartography of China
- Chinese exploration
- Chinese geography

=== Similar maps ===
- Da Ming Hun Yi Tu, c. late 14th century
- Gangnido Map, 1402
- Sihai Huayi Zongtu, 1532
- Kunyu Wanguo Quantu, 1602
- Shanhai Yudi Quantu, 1609
- Selden Map, c. 17th century
