= Da Ming Hunyi Tu =

14th-century Chinese map

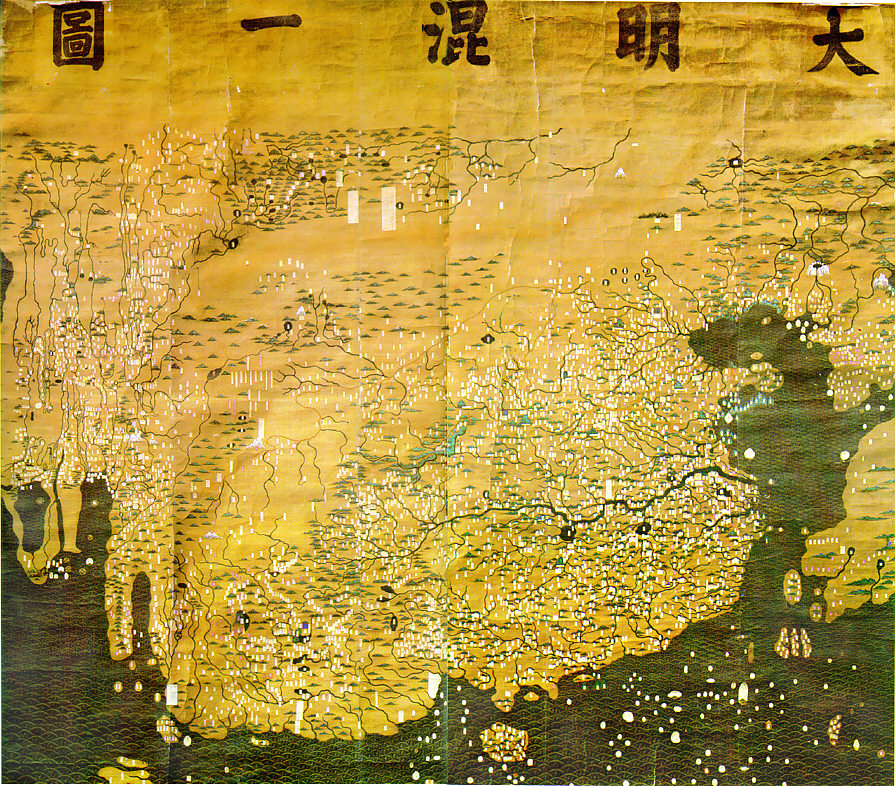

Chinese name
- Traditional Chinese: 大明混一圖
- Literal meaning: Amalgamated Map of the Great Ming
Transcriptions
Standard Mandarin
- Hanyu Pinyin: Dà Míng Hùnyī Tú

Manchu name
- Manchu script: ᡩᠠᡳ ᠮᡳᠩ ᡤᡠᡵᡠᠨ ᡳ ᡠᡥᡝᡵᡳᠯᡝᡥᡝ ᠨᡳᡵᡠᡤᠠᠨ
- Romanization: Dai Ming Gurun-i Uherilehe Nirugan

The Da Ming Hunyi Tu (Chinese for the "Amalgamated Map of the Ming Empire") is an extensive Chinese map. It was painted in colour on stiff silk and 386 x 456 cm in size. The original text was written in Classical Chinese, but on the surviving copy Manchu labels were later superimposed. The surviving copy of the map shows later revisions, and it is uncertain whether it is (or how closely it matches) the original.

It is one of the oldest surviving maps from East Asia, although the exact date of creation remains unknown. It depicts Eurasia, placing China in the center and stretching northward to Mongolia, southward to Java, eastward to central Japan, and westward to Europe (including the East African coast as an island).

== History ==
The place names of China on the map reflect the political situation in 1389, or the 22nd year of the reign of the Hongwu Emperor. Thus some Chinese scholars concluded that it was indeed created in 1389 or little later. Others maintain a cautious attitude, suggesting that what was created in 1389 is probably a source map of the Da Ming Hunyi Tu and that the Da Ming Hunyi Tu itself dates much later.

In either case, it is certain that the Ming dynasty created a map around 1389. Japanese scholar Miya Noriko speculated on the motivation behind it: Although the Hongwu Emperor, first of the Ming dynasty, drove the Mongol Yuan dynasty out of China in 1368, Mongols maintained military power that posed a real threat to the new dynasty. The situation was changed in 1388 when Uskhal Khan of Northern Yuan was killed and the Khubilaid line of succession was terminated. It is speculated that the Ming dynasty may have celebrated this historic event by creating a new map.

It has been kept on the Imperial Palace and was called Qingzi Qian Yitong Tu (清字簽一統圖; "Manchu alphabet-labelled unified map") in some catalogs. It is currently kept in protective storage at the First Historical Archive of China, in Beijing. A full-sized digital replica was made for the South African government in 2002.

== Relationship to other maps ==
Maps had for centuries played an important role in the government of China. This drove Chinese map technology to the frontier, employing techniques still utilised in modern cartography. For example, surviving map examples on stone dating from AD 1137 but based on much earlier surveys, show great accuracy using a grid system; by then the Chinese had also developed the magnetic compass.

By the early years of the 14th century, when Mongol domination over much of Eurasia created favourable conditions for east–west communication, Islamic maps of Europe and Africa found their way to China, encouraging Chinese cartographers to create world maps incorporating the new information.

Scholars consider that the Da Ming Hunyi Tu was based on a now lost world map named Shengjiao Guangbei Tu (聲教廣被圖). It was created by Li Zemin during the Mongol Yuan dynasty. Other extant maps considered to be based on Li's map are some copies of the Kangnido (1402) and a pair of maps named Dongnan Haiyi Tu (東南海夷圖) and Xinan Haiyi Tu (西南海夷圖), which is recorded in the Guang Yu Tu (廣與圖) (1555) by Luo Hongxian (羅洪先). Comparative studies of these extant maps are conducted to restore the content of Li's original world map. The Da Ming Hunyi Tu is especially important because Luo's copies dropped most place names except for coastal areas and islands and because the Kangnido was influenced by Korean cartography.

Compared to the Kangnido, the Da Ming Hunyi Tu provides more detailed information on Mongolia and Central Asia and India. In Manchuria, Changbai Mountain, where the foundation myth of the Manchu Aisin Gioro imperial family was set, is overly portrayed. It presents India as a peninsula while it sinks into the "Chinese continent" on the Kangnido. It is presumed that India was portrayed as a peninsula on Li's map but shrunk by Korean Confucians due to their anti-Buddhist policy. Africa and Arabia on the Da Ming Hunyi Tu resemble those on the Kangnido while Europe is considerably different. It is also distinct from the Kangnido in the depiction of the source of the Yellow River, which looks very similar to that in Luo's Guang Yu Tu.

== Content ==
The Earth's curvature affects even the scale of the Chinese section of the map. Horizontally, it works out at about 1:820,000; but vertically it is around 1:1,060,000. It replicates the curvature of the Earth by compression of areas farthest away from China. Outside China, sub-Saharan Africa is depicted in a good approximation of the correct shape, complete with mountains near the southern tip. The interior of Africa has a river with twin sources (the common depiction in Classical and Islamic maps of the Nile) starts in the south of the continent, but enters the Red Sea, while the Nile has its source in a vast inland sea.

Arabia is squeezed horizontally, but recognisable. The prominent peninsula on the west coast of the Chinese landmass is the Malay Peninsula, but India is represented merely as a collection of place-names north-west of Arabia. Additionally, observe Japan, over-sized and misshapen, confusingly meeting the more correctly sized and positioned Taiwan; this suggests collaboration with external sources.
