= Selden Map =

17th century map of China and Southeast Asia

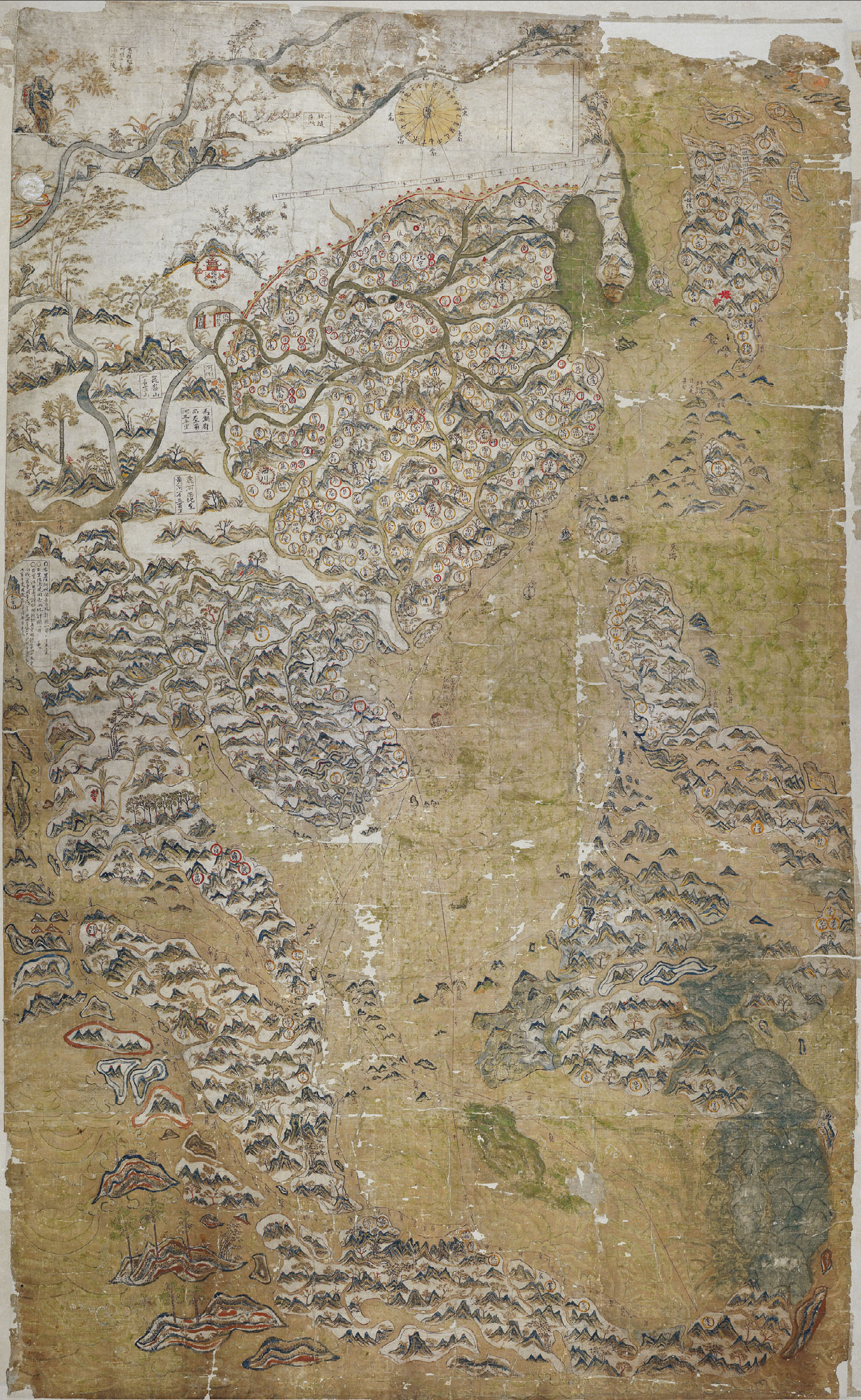
Selden map

The Selden Map of China (Bodleian Library, MS Selden Supra 105) is an early 17th century map of East Asia formerly owned by the legal scholar and maritime theorist John Selden. It shows a system of navigational routes emanating from a point near the cities of Quanzhou and Zhangzhou in Fujian province, from which a principal route goes northeast towards Nagasaki and southwest towards Hoi An, then Champa, and then on to Pahang, and then with another route heading past Penghu towards a point northwest by Manila.

The map, largely unseen and forgotten since the 18th century, was rediscovered in 2008 by the historian Robert Batchelor at an Oxford University library. Batchelor recognized the significance of the system of routes depicted on the map. As the earliest surviving Chinese merchant map of East Asia, it has been recognized as one of the Treasures of the Bodleian. The map itself has no title, and the "Selden Map of China" was chosen by David Helliwell as curator of Chinese collections at the Bodleian. The Chinese title, 東西洋航海圖 (Dongxi yang hanghai tu: "Navigation Chart of the Eastern and Western Oceans") has been proposed by Chen Jiarong.

== Date and composition ==
The map is mentioned in the 1653 will of John Selden. It became part of the Bodleian's collections in 1659. Thomas Hyde and Shen Fuzong (Michael Shen Fu-Tsung) studied and annotated it extensively in 1687, but it was largely relegated to the status of a curiosity after Edmund Halley dismissed its accuracy. There is no firm documentary evidence for the date or location of the map's composition or its whereabouts before 1653.

Scholars studying the map after its rediscovery have put forward competing theories as to its provenance. Generally, it is agreed that the map was made sometime after 1606 and before 1624. The historian Timothy Brook favors an earlier date, based on his argument that John Saris obtained the map in 1608 and brought it back to England in October 1609. Like many Europeans in the late 16th and early 17th century, Saris was interested in Chinese maps and subsequently obtained a different map of China, famously published by Samuel Purchas. Robert Batchelor argues for a later date of around 1619, noting that certain features on the map, such as the detailed depiction of two landings on Taiwan, indicate knowledge not held prior to the 1610s.

The debate over the dating of the map also involves a debate over its composition. Brook believes that the map was made in Java, based on the Saris theory of acquisition and his sense that the southern half of the map is the most "geographically informed." Batchelor believes the possibility that it was made in, or at least passed through, Manila as he argues that the density of ports around Luzon as well as Japan and Vietnam make a northern source more likely, possibly someone who made it for the merchant/pirate Li Dan, the patron of Zheng Zhilong, father of Koxinga. According to the East India Company factor Richard Cocks, Li Dan had spent time as the head of the Chinese community in Manila, before being imprisoned by the Spanish and later escaping to Nagasaki. A pair of bright red chrysanthemums, unique on the map, mark a spot near Hirado, Nagasaki, where Li Dan had his factory. Both historians use a process of elimination to make arguments for the map's date and composition, and there remain numerous candidates for where the map was made, for what reason and for the actual cartographer. In 2016, researchers studying the map at Nottingham Trent University published a chemical analysis of the paper that they state backs a hypothesis that the map was composed in Aceh, Sumatra, based on spectral analysis of the binding medium and pigments used.

The routes and locations on the map have parallels with but do not match two famous accounts of navigation from the early 17th century, notably the Shunfeng Xiangsong (順風相送) owned by William Laud and now also in the Bodleian, the maps of Zheng He's voyages in the Wubei Zhi (ca. 1628) and Zhang Xie's (張燮) Dongxi Yangkao (東西洋考, 1617). After the back was removed in 2011 as part of restoration by Robert Minte and a team of experts, a draft of the main route running between Nagasaki and Pahang was revealed along with hash marks indicating the rule used for determining the length of lines.

== See also ==
- History of Chinese cartography
- Cartography of China
- Mao Kun map
