= Luo Hongxian =

Chinese cartographer (1504–1564)

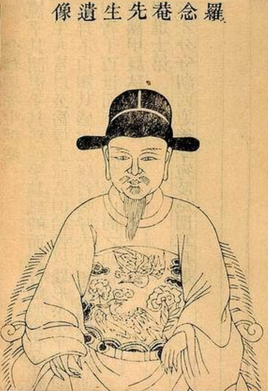
Luo Hongxian from 1504

Luo Hongxian (Chinese: 羅洪先; 1504–1564) was a Ming dynasty Chinese cartographer. He also studied astronomy, geography, irrigation methods, military affairs and mathematics.

After passing the Imperial Examinations with the rank of jinshi in 1529, Luo worked as a senior compiler at the Hanlin Academy. He was a student of the philosophies of the Neo-Confucian Wang Yangming. Hearing of raids by wokou pirates on China's south-eastern shores, he began collating cartographical information for the Ming government, spending three years in research. During this period, he discovered the Yutu (Terrestrial Map), an atlas of China created by Zhu Siben during the Yuan dynasty some 300 years earlier around 1320, which he adapted and expanded using Chinese measuring methods to create his Guang Yu Tu 廣與圖 (Enlarged territorial atlas), a work that covered the entire country. It was first published in 1561, and remained the principal reference work in Chinese cartography until the 17th century. The map included mountains, rivers, boundaries, roads, and other landmarks. Luo's maps and geographical knowledge were put to use in the defense of the coast, and he was offered several government posts as a result but declined these offers.

Martino Martini, an Italian Jesuit in China, drew his own Novus Atlas Sinensis (based on the Guang Yu Tu), which was published in Amsterdam by Joan Blaeu in 1655. Martini's map remained the standard European view of China until 1737, when Jean Baptiste d'Anville published his Atlas de la Chine.

His work would go on to influence other maps such as the Da Ming Guangyu Kao (An Examination of the Enlarged Terrestrial [Map] of the Great Ming Dynasty from 1610) and Chen Zushou's Huang Ming Zhifang Ditu (An Administrative Map of the Ming Dynasty from 1636), which were banned during the Qing dynasty period.
