= Great Underwater Wall =

China's military underwater program

The Great Underwater Wall is a People's Republic of China military program to monitor submarine, surface, and aerial vehicle activity in the seas adjacent to China. The submarine monitoring system in the South China Sea, is called the "Great Underwater Wall" (Chinese: 水下长城) and the "Underwater Monitoring System" (Chinese: 水下监听系统) in Chinese media.

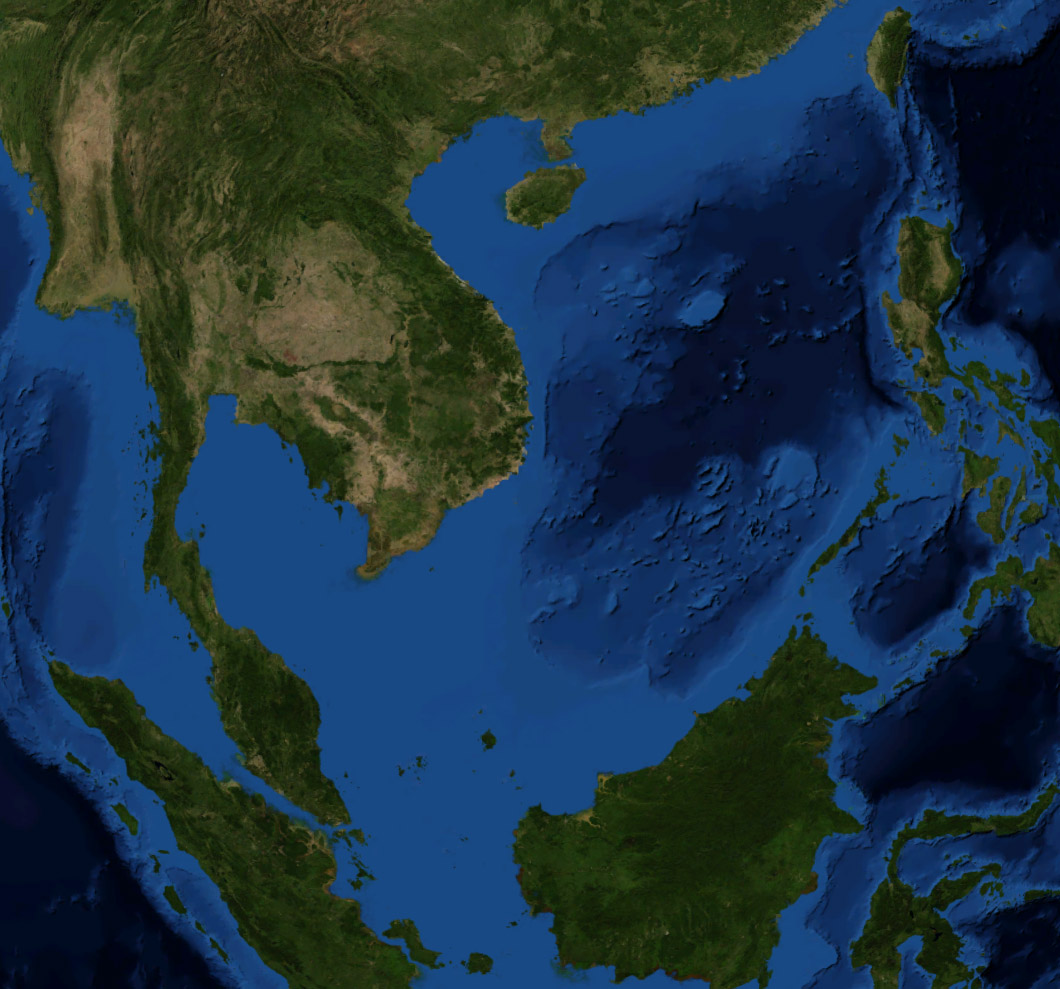
South China Sea, where elements of the Great Underwater Wall system are installed

== Developer ==
The program is being developed by China State Shipbuilding Corporation (CSSC).

== System composition ==
The program plans to create a monitoring system of surface and underwater conditions. The system will include:

- Passive sonar systems located on the seafloor
- Active sonar systems
- Remote controlled underwater drones (UUV)
- Remotely controlled surface vessels (USV).

== Construction and deployment plans ==
Currently, work is underway to create individual elements of the system. Infrastructure is under construction. According to one of the plans, the first elements of the system will be deployed in the South China Sea.

The basis of the system will be hydroacoustic sensors located on the seabed at depths of up to 3000 meters. The coastal elements will be located at military bases on artificial islands that are being built in the Spratly Archipelago, between the Philippines, Malaysia and Vietnam.

The cost of the program is 2 billion yuan (313 million US dollars).

China has been operating two underwater sensors since 2016, located in the Challenger Deep and off the island of Yap, Micronesia. The sensors reportedly have the acoustic range to detect movement at Naval Base Guam, and reportedly may allow China to monitor the movements of the US Navy, including its submarines.

== See also ==
- First island chain
