= Cartography of China =

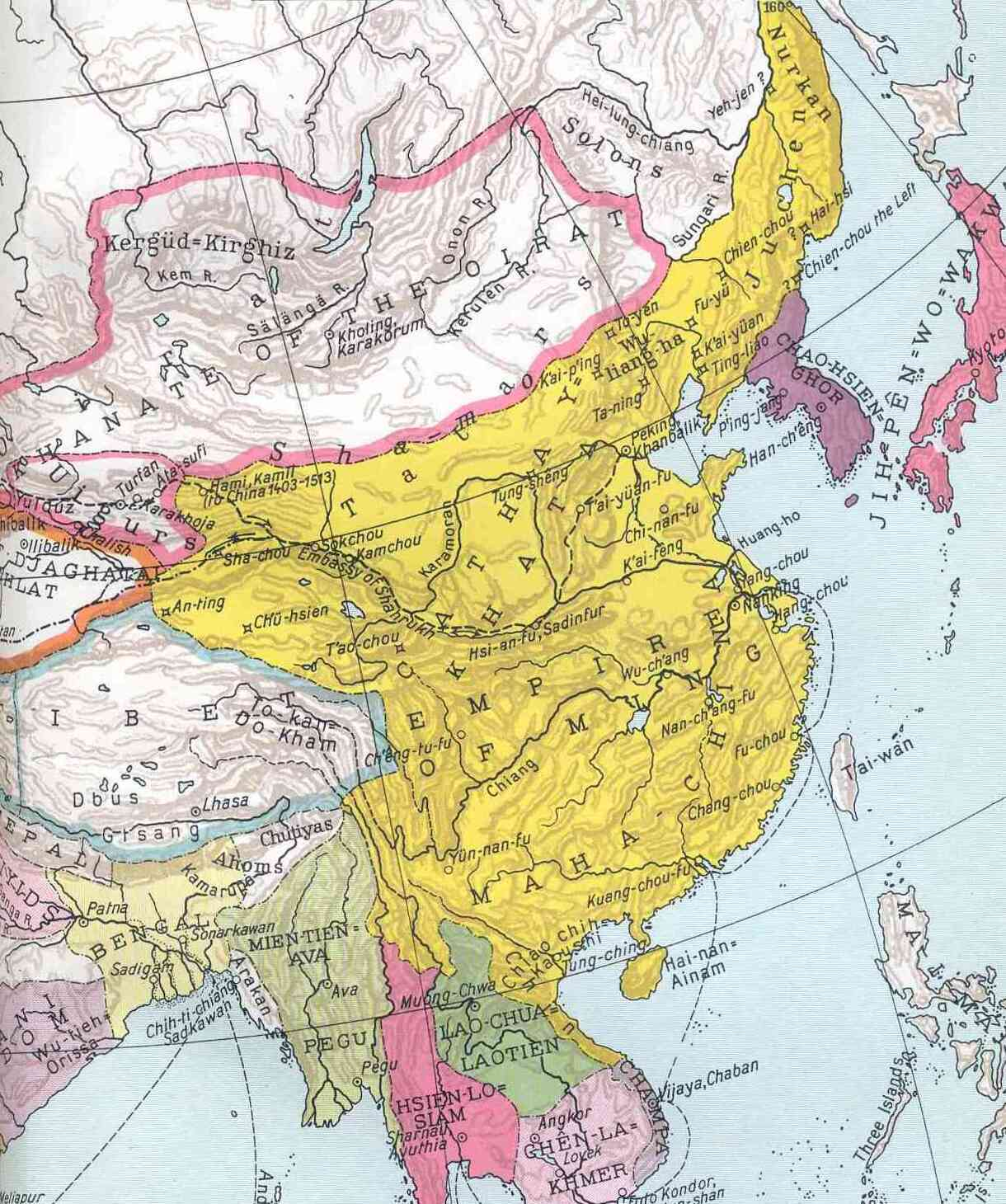
Ming empire territory in 1415

Chinese cartography began in the 5th century BC during the Warring States period when cartographers started to make maps of the Earth's surface. Its scope extended beyond China's borders with the expansion of the Chinese Empire under the Han dynasty. By the 11th century during the Song dynasty highly-accurate maps drawn on grids were produced. During the 15th century, the Ming dynasty admiral Zheng He went on a series of voyages to the South China Sea, Indian Ocean, and beyond and maps for areas outside of China were produced, although world maps covering territories known to the Chinese outside of China existed as early as the Tang dynasty.

The study of geography in China begins in the Warring States period (5th century BC). It expands its scope beyond the Chinese homeland with the growth of the Chinese Empire under the Han dynasty and enters a golden age with the Han dynasty invention of the compass as one of the Four Great Inventions. The compass was then used from the 11th century during the Song dynasty, Yuan dynasty, Ming dynasty, and Qing dynasty in the study of geography. One of the most famous explorers in Chinese history was the 15th century admiral Zheng He, known for the Chinese exploration of the Pacific and his treasure voyages.

== Earliest reference to maps in historical texts ==
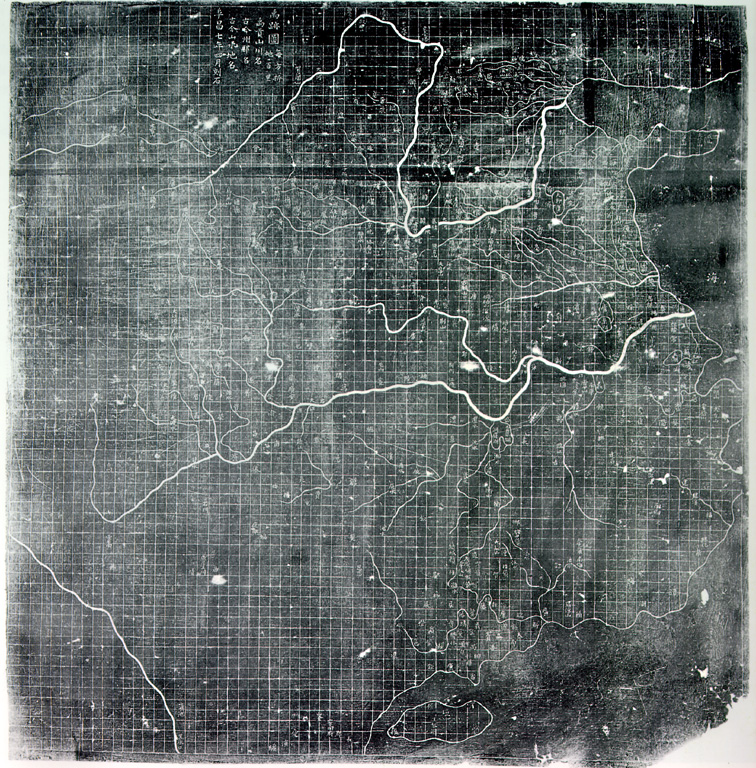
The Yu Ji Tu, or Map of the Tracks of Yu Gong, carved into stone in 1137, located in the Stele Forest of Xi'an, Shaanxi, China. This 3 ft (0.91 m) squared map features a graduated scale of 100 li for each rectangular grid. China's coastline and river systems are clearly defined and precisely pinpointed on the map. On the reverse side of the engraving is another map, Huayi tu.

The earliest reference to a map in Chinese history can be found in Volume 86 of the historical text Records of the Grand Historian (Shi Ji). This volume recorded an incident in 227 BC during the late Warring States period in which a map is mentioned. Crown Prince Dan of the Yan state sent Jing Ke to assassinate the King of the Qin state, so as to prevent Qin from conquering Yan. Jing Ke pretended to be an emissary from Yan, and said he wanted to present the King of Qin with a map of Dukang, a fertile region in Yan which would be ceded to Qin in exchange for peace between the two states. The map, which was rolled up and held in a case, had a poison-coated dagger hidden in it. As Jing Ke was showing the King the map, he slowly unrolled the map until the dagger was revealed, and then seized it and tried to stab the King. The King managed to escape unharmed and Jing Ke was killed in his failed assassination attempt. From then on, maps are frequently mentioned in Chinese historical texts.

== Qin dynasty maps ==
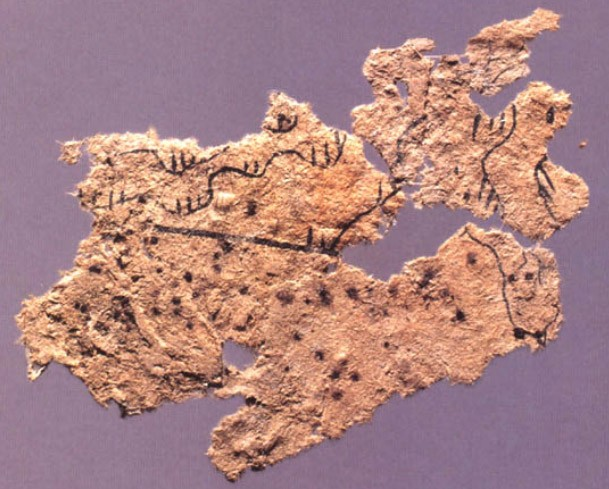
Fragment of the paper map from Fangmatan Tomb 5

In 1986, seven maps were found in Tomb 1, dating to the Qin state of the Warring States period, at Fangmatan in Gansu Province. The maps were drawn in black ink on four rectangular pieces of pine wood, 26.7 cm in length and between 15 and 18.1 cm in width, and depict the tributary river systems of the Jialing River in Sichuan Province. The areas covered by the seven maps overlap, but in total they cover 107 × 68 km in area.

In addition to the seven maps on wooden blocks found at Tomb 1 of Fangmatan, a fragment of a paper map (5.6 × 2.6 cm) was found on the chest of the occupant of Tomb 5 of Fangmatan in 1986. This tomb is dated to the early Western Han dynasty, so the map dates to the early 2nd century BC. The map shows topographic features such as mountains, waterways and roads, and is believed to cover the Qin state of the Warring States period.

== Han dynasty maps ==
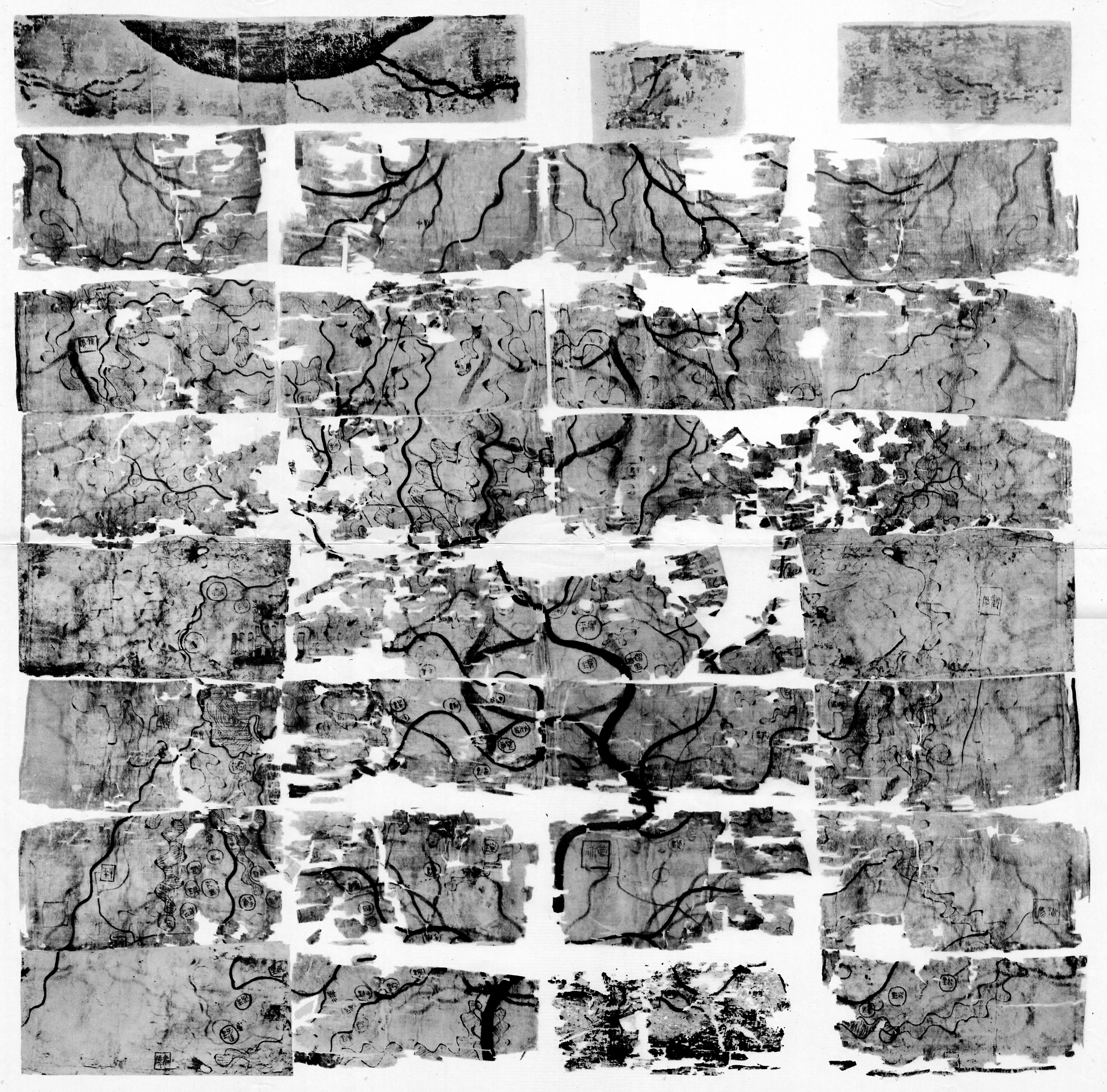
Silk map from Mawangdui, dating back to circa 168 BC.

Concrete evidence of the existence of maps in ancient China can be found in the Han dynasty (206 BC – 220 AD). The three silk maps found at the Mawangdui tumulus in Changsha, Hunan Province are traced back to the 2nd century BC. The three maps are a topographic map of the Changsha region, a military map of southern Changsha, and a prefecture map.

Research on the three maps shows that the Han dynasty had access to advanced cartography skills. Although the military map does not contain names, a legend, scales, or any form of explanatory text, it shows modern Hunan, Guangdong and Guangxi provinces, as well as the boundary between the Han Empire and Nanyue Kingdom, covering the area from 111°E to 112°30′E, and from 23°N to 26°N. The scale of the map is approximately 1:180000.

At the time of their discovery, these three silk maps were the oldest to be found in China. However, they were superseded in 1986 after Qin dynasty maps dating back to the 4th century BC were found in Fangmatan, Tianshui, Gansu Province.

After the Han dynasty, Pei Xiu of the Jin dynasty helped improve Chinese cartography by making use of the grid previously introduced by Zhang Heng. Pei Xiu became known as the 'father of scientific cartography in China'.

== Tang and Song dynasty maps ==
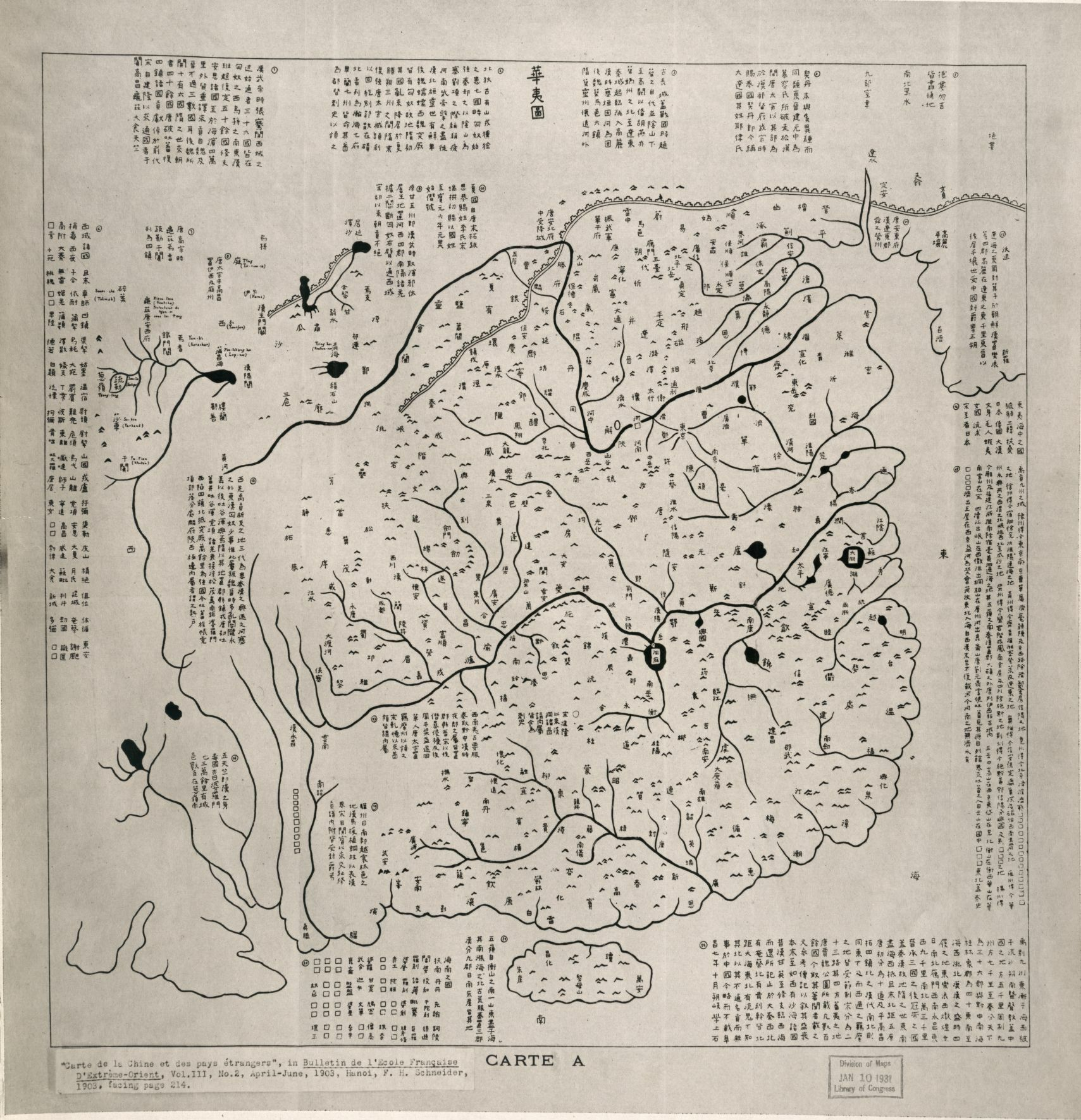
Copy of the Huayi tu, a 12th-century map of China. Included in the map is the Great Wall of China and it covers all the territories of China with a few foreign states on the edge.

During the Tang dynasty, Jia Dan improved the knowledge of China on foreign countries. He wrote a number of works on geography that described foreign states and trade routes, as well as producing a map Hainei Huayi Tu (海内華夷圖, "Map of Chinese and non-Chinese Territories in the World"). The map includes China and other known countries and was presented to the emperor in 801. The map was 9.1 m (30 ft) in length and 10 m (33 ft) in height, mapped out on a grid scale of one inch equaling one hundred li (Chinese unit of measuring distance).

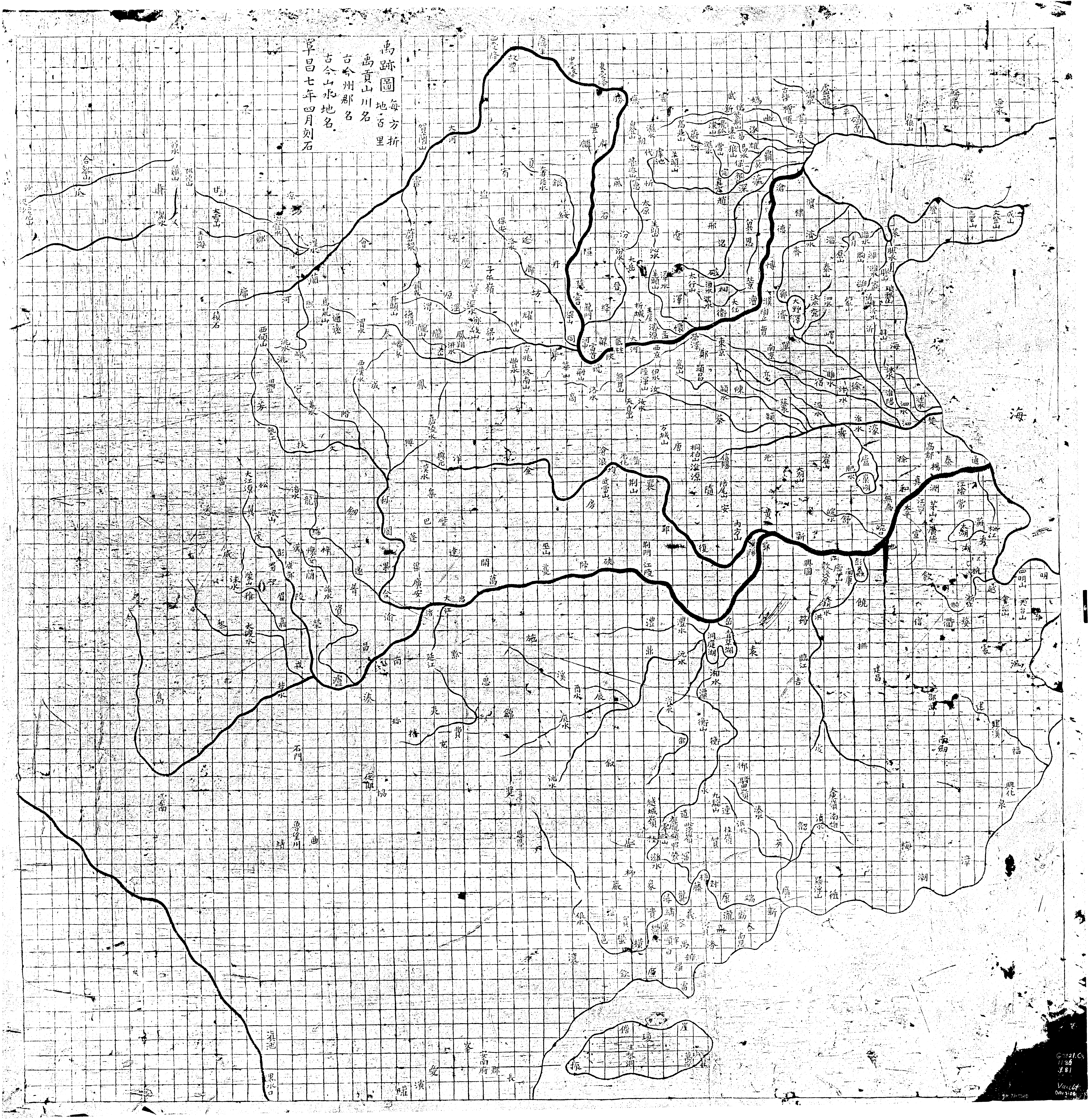
The Yu Ji Tu, "Map of the Tracks of Yu", carved into stone in 1137, located in the Stele Forest of Xi'an. This 3 ft (0.91 m) squared map features a grid of 100 li squares. China's coastline and river systems are clearly defined and precisely pinpointed on the map. Yu is Yu the Great, a Chinese deity and author of the Yu Gong, the geography chapter of the Book of Documents, dating to the 4th or 5th century BCE.

The Hainei Huayi Tu map is lost, but a later map of China from the Southern Song period, the Huayi tu map engraved in 1136 on a stele, contains names of foreign places inscribed on the edges that it took from Jia Dan's map. The map shows 500 settlements and a dozen rivers in China, and includes large parts of Korea and Vietnam. On the reverse side of Huayi tu is the gridded Yu Ji Tu (Map of the Tracks of Yu the Great). This map is the earliest surviving example of lattice cartographic grid found in Chinese map, a system first introduced in China a millennium earlier. The stele with the maps is now in the Stele Forest or Beilin Museum (碑林; Bēilín) in Xi'an, China.

== Yuan and Ming dynasty maps ==
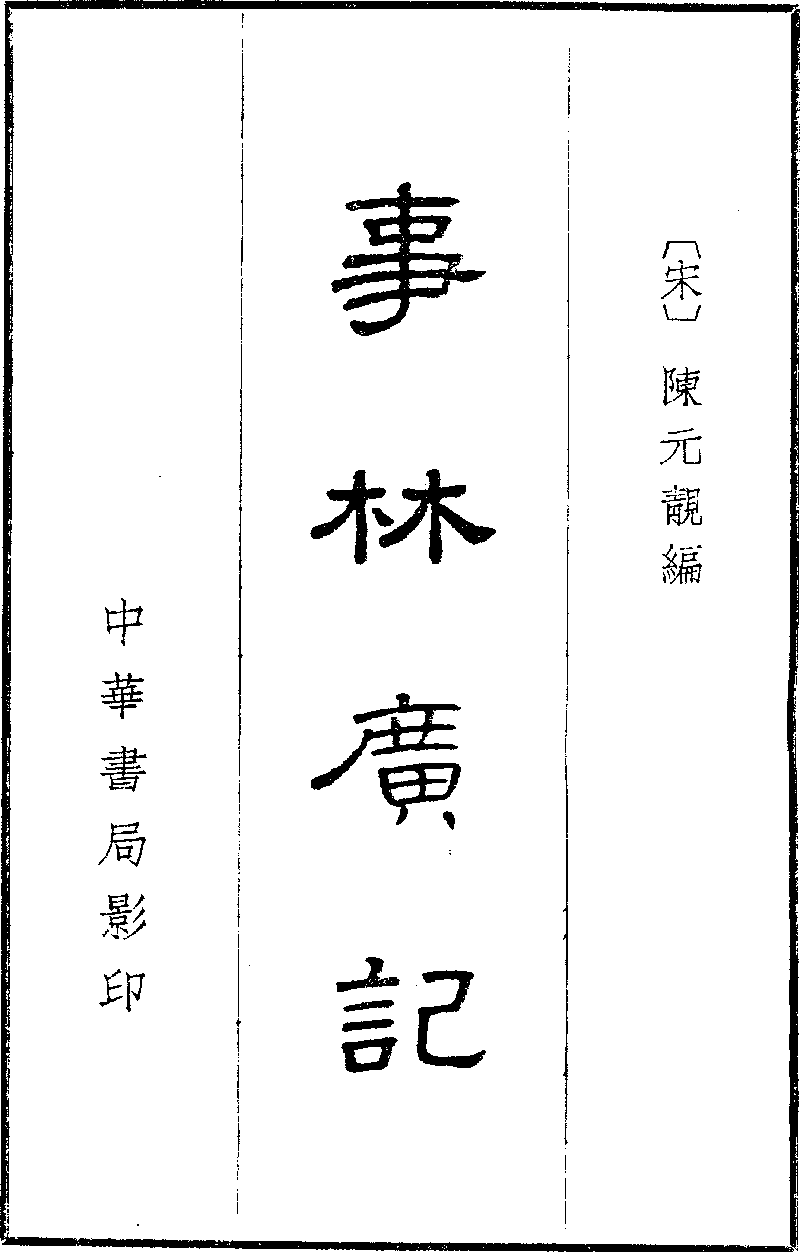
Shilin Guangji, Yuan dynasty geography book written by Chen Yuanjing during the reign of Mongol emperor Kublai Khan

The expansion of Chinese geographical enterprise to a world scale originates from a historical setting of the Mongol Empire, which connected the western Islamic world with the Chinese sphere, enabling both trade and the exchange of information.

After the founding of the Yuan dynasty in 1271, Kublai Khan ordered the compilation of a geography monograph named Dayuan Dayitong Zhi (大元大一統志) (extant manuscripts lack maps) in 1285. In 1286, Persian astronomer Jamāl al-Dīn made Kublai Khan (who had brought him east to undertake co-operative research with Chinese scholars in the 1260s) a proposal for merging several maps of the empire into a single world map, and it resulted in the Tianxia Dili Zongtu (天下地理總圖). It was supposedly a world map but is lost today. He also ordered to obtain a book called Rāh-nāmah (road book) from Muslim sailors. An extant map attached to the Jingshi Dadian (經世大典; 1329–1333) proves Mongols' accurate knowledge on Inner Asia that was obtained from Muslims. Influences by these official projects, Taoist monk Zhu Siben (朱思本) compiled a geography monograph of China named Jiuyu Zhi (九域志) in 1297. Based on this earlier work, he created a now lost map of China named Yuditu (與地圖) in 1311–1320.

However, these materials were too large for circulation. What directly impacted Chinese intellectuals were other compilations. In the first half of the 14th century, encyclopedias such as the Hanmo Quanshu (翰墨全書) and the Zhishun edition of the Shilin Guangji (事林廣記), written by Chen Yuanjing (陈元靓), updated their geographic knowledge from the preceding Jurchen Jin and Southern Song Dynasties to the contemporary Mongol-ruled Yuan dynasty.

Throughout the Yuan (1271–1368) and Ming (1368–1644) dynasties, Chinese cartography did not experience any radical developments. However, traditional cartography skills became more refined, and different types of maps starting appearing. The new types of maps include national maps showing mountains and cities, land defence maps, coastal defence maps, river maps for flood control, and nautical charts for maritime navigation. These maps exhibited characteristics such as greater focus on the accuracy of rivers and mountains, greater use of mathematics in cartography, and the use of administrative divisions to demarcate boundaries.

Newly discovered materials reveal personal networks among intellectuals of southern China, centered in Qingyuan (Ningbo). Qingjun, who was from neighboring Taizhou, created the Hunyi Jiangli Tu when he stayed in Qingyuan. Wu Sidao, who left an important bibliographic clue, was also from Qingyuan. In addition, Ningbo was one of the most important seaports and the sea routes were extended to Fuzhou and Guangzhou, and Southeast Asia, Japan and Goryeo. They must have acquired marine information from Muslim sailors.

Maps in the Chinese tradition tended to be known by specific titles, easily expressed as short sequences of ideograms, such as the Yu Gong Jiuzhou Lidai Diwang Guodu Dili Tu (禹貢九州歷代帝王國都地理圖; Map of Capitals of Historical Emperors and Kings in the Nine Provinces described in the Yu Gong).

=== Shengjiao Guangbei Tu ===
The Shengjiao Guangbei Tu ("map of the resounding teaching (of the khan) prevailing all over the world") by Li Zemin is lost. Its original state can be deduced by examining its derivative works: the Guangyutu (廣與圖) (1555) by Luo Hongxian (羅洪先) contains a pair of maps named Dongnan Haiyi Tu (東南海夷圖) and Xinan Haiyi Tu (西南海夷圖) that are considered to be the southern half of the Shengjiao Guangbei Tu although Luo's copy dropped most place names except for coastal areas and islands. The Da Ming Hun Yi Tu (大明混一圖/Dai Ming gurun-i uherilehe nirugan), a Ming period map with much later Manchu translations of its labels, is also considered to have been based ultimately on Li Zemin's map.

The Shengjiao Guangbei Tu was a world map. It contained not only China but also Africa and Europe. Luo's copy and the Daming Hunyi Tu suggest that the original depicted India more accurately than the Korean adaptation although it is also possible that the Daming Hunyi Tu reflects 17th century knowledge.

Little is known about the author Li Zemin. Based on place names on the map, it has been presumed that it was created around 1319 and revised sometime between 1329 and 1338. However, Wu Sidao's statement (described later) suggests that his map was newer than Qingjun's (1360?).

=== Da Ming Hun Yi Tu ===
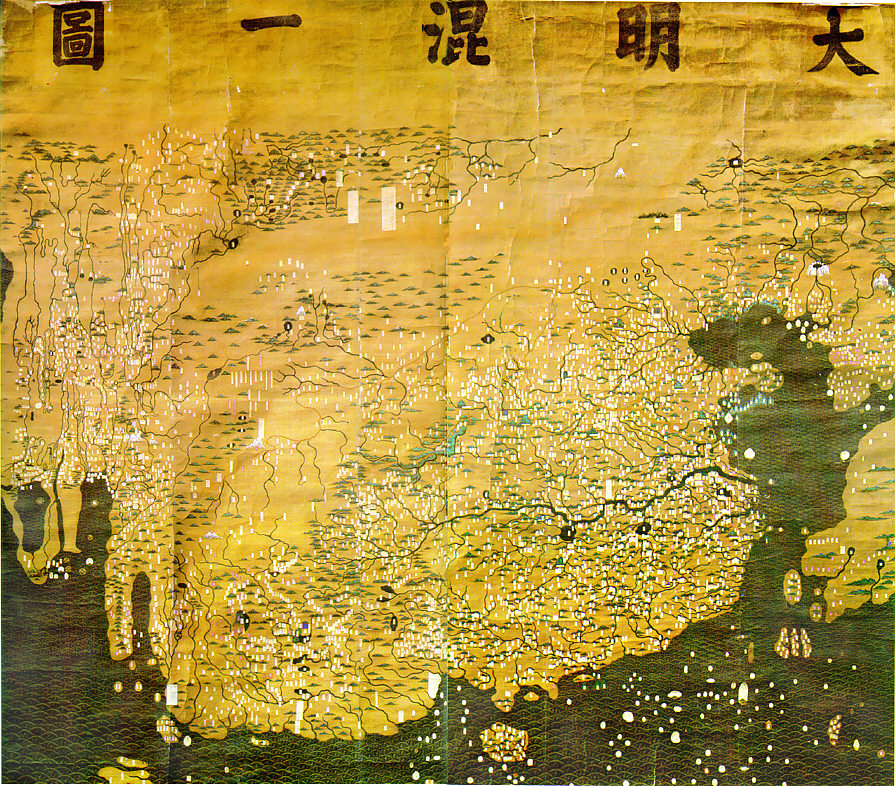
The Da Ming Hun Yi Tu, dating from about 1390, is in multicolour. The horizontal scale is 1:820000 and the vertical scale is 1:1060000.

The Great Ming Amalgamated Map or Da Ming Hun Yi Tu (Chinese: 大明混一圖; pinyin: dàmíng hùn yī tú; Manchu: dai ming gurun-i uherilehe nirugan) is a world map created in China. It was painted in colour on stiff silk and 386 x 456 cm in size. The original text was written in Classical Chinese, but Manchu labels were later superimposed on them. It is one of the oldest surviving world maps from East Asia although the exact date of creation remains unknown. It depicts the general form of the Old World, placing China in the center and stretching northward to Mongolia, southward to Java, eastward to central Japan, and westward to Africa and Europe. The Earth's curvature affects even the scale of the Chinese section of the map. The horizontal scale is 1:820000 while the vertical scale is 1:1,060,000. The use of colour is particularly effective within China itself, including elegant touches like the ochre tint of the Yellow River.

=== Guanglun Jiangli Tu ===
The Hunyi Jiangli Tu by Zen monk Qingjun (1328–1392) is lost. However, the Shuidong Riji (水東日記) by the Ming period book collector Ye Sheng (葉盛) (1420–1474) includes a modified edition of the map by the name of Guanglun Jiangli Tu (廣輪疆理圖). Ye Sheng also recorded Yan Jie (嚴節)'s colophon to the map (1452). According to Yan Jie, the Guanglun Jiangli Tu was created in 1360. The extant map was modified, probably by Yan Jie, to catch up with contemporary Ming place names. The original map covered place names of the Mongol-ruled Yuan dynasty.

The Guanglun Jiangli Tu was one of historical maps that were popular among Chinese intellectuals. It showed historical capitals of Chinese dynasties in addition to contemporary place names. It followed Chinese tradition in that it was a map of China, not the world. But contrary to Song period maps which reflected limited Chinese knowledge on geography, it incorporated information on Mongolia and Southeast Asia. It also provided information of sea routes (there remain traces on the Honmyōji map).

=== Wu Sidao's work ===
Contemporary to Qingjun, Wu Sidao (烏斯道), author of Chuncaozhai Ji (春草齋集), merged the Guanglun Tu (廣輪圖) and Li Rulin (李汝霖)'s Shengjiao Beihua Tu (聲教被化圖) although his map is not known today. The Guanglun Tu must refer to Qingjun's Guanglun Jiangli Tu. It may be that Rulin was Li Zemin's courtesy name and the Shengjiao Beihua Tu was an alias for the Shengjiao Guangbei Tu.

=== Zheng He ===
Among Ming dynasty maps, Zheng He's map, also known as Mao Kun map, was the most influential nautical chart. Between 1405 and 1433, the Ming government sponsored Zheng He to go on a series of seven naval expeditions to places in the South China Sea, Indian Ocean, and beyond. Thus, Zheng He's map was the important in the history of Chinese cartography and a specific one for maritime navigation. It also exhibited some special characteristics in terms of how its contents are presented:

- For map readers' convenience, the map is continuously splicing from the starting point of Zheng He's voyages to the ending point.
- Geographical features were drawn based on the map reader's orientation, such that map readers can find their position in the shortest time possible.
- Landmarks used in maps for maritime navigation, such as reefs, ports and islands, are included.

=== Luo Hongxian ===
In 1579, Luo Hongxian published the Guang Yu Tu (廣與圖) atlas, which includes more than 40 maps, a grid system, and a systematic way of representing major geographical features such as mountains, rivers, roads and borders. The Guang Yu Tu incorporates the discoveries of admiral Zheng He's 15th century voyages along the coasts of China, Southeast Asia, India, and East Africa.

=== Late Ming ===
Left plates 1-3

Right plates 4-6

Kunyu Wanguo Quantu (坤輿萬國全圖), a map printed by Matteo Ricci, Zhong Wentao and Li Zhizao, upon request of Wanli Emperor in 1602

Chinese traditional cartography skills became more developed and advanced in the late Ming dynasty under the influence of new ideas of technology and studies of natural science, which were introduced from the West to China. From the 16th and 17th centuries, several examples survive of maps focused on cultural information. Gridlines are not used on either Yu Shi's Gujin xingsheng zhi tu (1555) or Zhang Huang's Tushu bian (1613); instead, illustrations and annotations show mythical places, exotic foreign peoples, administrative changes and the deeds of historic and legendary heroes.

The Selden Map of China, which dates from the early 17th century and shows a series of precisely plotted maritime routes, has provoked a reassessment of the global significance of Ming cartography.

== Qing dynasty survey maps ==
The Kangxi Emperor of the Qing dynasty (1644–1912) realised that Chinese maps were not accurate enough and required scientific methods for mapping, so he sponsored a national wide geodesy and mapping programme based on astronomical observation and triangulation measurements. The map, which is called Huang Yu Quan Lan Tu (also known as the Jesuit Atlas), took over 10 years to complete from 1708. It was also the first on-the-spot survey map. It had 41 framings based on provincial boundaries and has the following characteristics:

- Use of pseudo-cylindrical projection and latitude and longitude cartography methods
- Simultaneous use of Chinese and Manchu languages. Frontier area were labeled in Manchu, while Chinese proper were labeled in Chinese.
- Inclusion of a survey map of Taiwan for the first time

Apart from cartography, the unification of scale measurement and the field measurement of meridian of earth contributed to the development of cartography in the Qing dynasty and helped to significantly improve the quality of maps.

== Modern ==
After the 1949 revolution, the Institute of Geography under the aegis of the Chinese Academy of Sciences became responsible for official cartography and emulated the Soviet model of geography throughout the 1950s. With its emphasis on fieldwork, sound knowledge of the physical environment and the interrelation between physical and economic geography, the Russian influence counterbalanced the many pre-liberation Western-trained Chinese geography specialists who were more interested in the historical and culture aspects of cartography. As a consequence, China's main geographical journal, the Dili Xuebao (地理学报) featured many articles by Soviet geographers. As Soviet influence waned in the 1960s, geographic activity continued as part of the process of modernisation until it came to a stop with the 1967 Cultural Revolution.

Since 1949, the cartography of China has moved from a traditional form to a digital form by using technologies such as artificial intelligence, big data, and mobile communication technology.

== Highlights ==
Warring States

- Seven Qin State maps dated to the 4th century BC are found in Gansu province in 1986
- Crown Prince Dan and Jing Ke's assassination plot against Qin Shi Huang in 227 BC, first reference to a map drawn on silk.

Han

- Mawangdui Han tombs site reveals three maps drawn on silk, dated to the 2nd century BC, found in 1973
- Shiji by Sima Qian, which included a wealth of geographical material thanks to the travels of Zhang Qian in Central Asia
- Book of Han
- Rites of Zhou
- Liu An (2nd century BC), Huainanzi
- Yuejue Shu, the first gazetteer in China, written in 52 CE.

Three Kingdoms

- Pei Xiu (3rd century), the "father of Chinese cartography" produced a map of China with plotted grid lines and a graduated scale.
- Yu Huan, wrote the Weilüe (preserved in the Records of the Three Kingdoms), including information on countries as far away as West Asia and the eastern provinces of the Roman Empire

Liu Song dynasty

- Fan Ye (historian) wrote the Book of Later Han; contains information on countries as far as West Asia, including Daqin, the Roman Empire

Tang

- Bianji (7th century), Great Tang Records on the Western Regions
- Jia Dan (8th century)
- Duan Chengshi (9th century)

Song

- Su Song (11th century)
- Shen Kuo (11th century)
- Fan Chengda (12th century)

Yuan

- Chen Yuanjing (13th century), Shilin Guangji
- Zhou Daguan (13th century)
- Wang Dayuan (14th century)
- Yu Qin (14th century)

Ming

- Zheng He (15th century)
- Xu Xiake (17th century)
- Matteo Ricci and Xu Guangqi (17th century)
- Giulio Aleni (1623)
- Martino Martini (1655)

Qing

- Gu Zuyu Dushi Fangyu Jiyao

== See also ==
- Chinese exploration
- Chinese geography
- Geography of China
- History of cartography
  - History of cartography#China
- Cartography
- Kangnido
- Mawangdui
- List of cartographers
- 1421 hypothesis
