= Pulau Beras =

Coordinates: 4°9′5.00″S 104°27′29.77″E

Pulau Beras is an island in western Sumatra, Indonesia. It is described in Chinese explorer Zheng He's Mao Kun map.
