= Bianjing =

Historical name of Kaifeng, China

Bianjing 汴京 Kaifeng, Dongjing, Bianliang
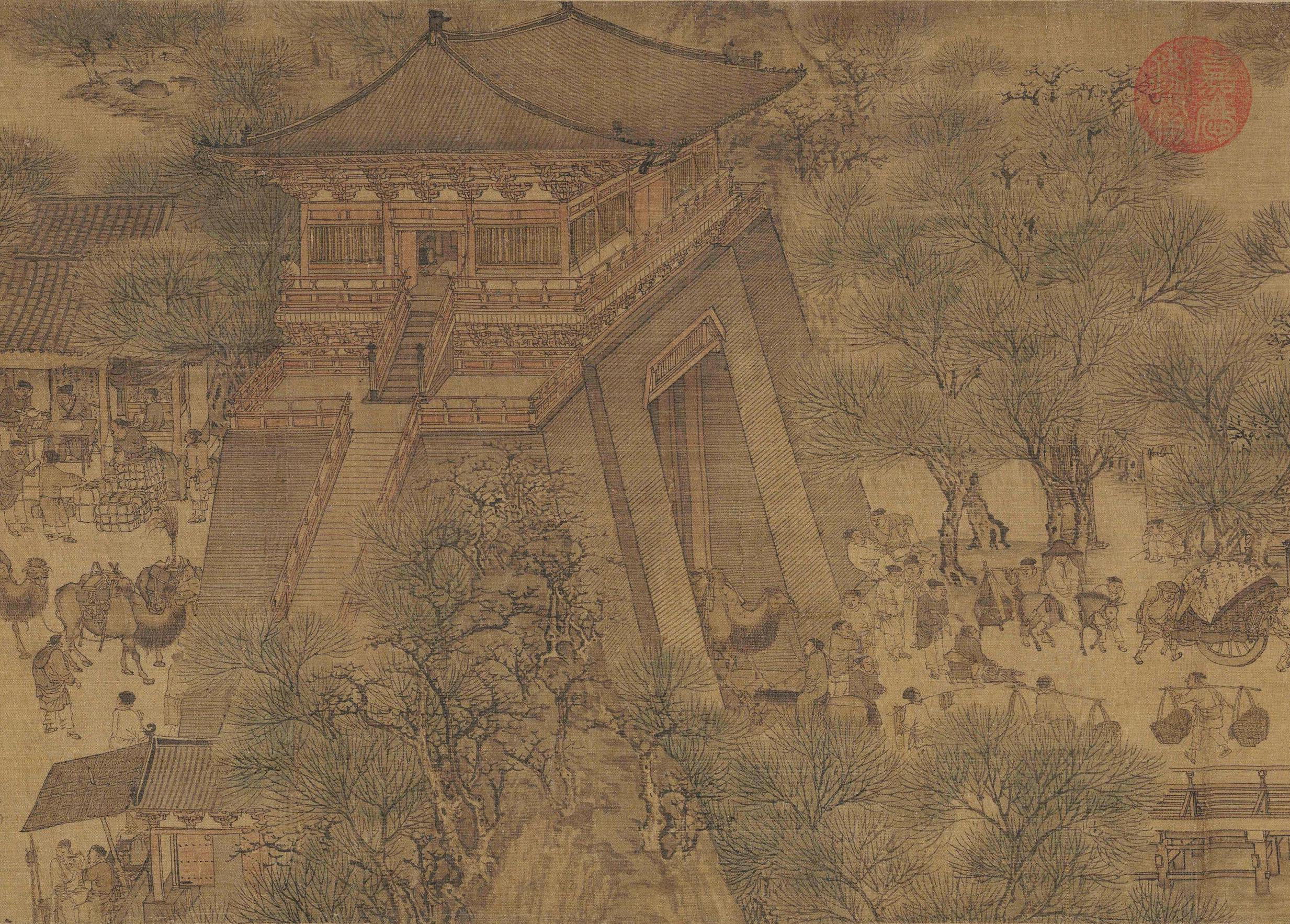
- Interactive map of Bianjing
- Present-day country: China
- Province: Henan
- City: Kaifeng

汴京
- Traditional Chinese: 汴京
- Simplified Chinese: 汴京
Transcriptions
Standard Mandarin
- Hanyu Pinyin: Biànjīng
- Wade–Giles: Pien-ching

东京
- Traditional Chinese: 東京
- Simplified Chinese: 东京
Transcriptions
Standard Mandarin
- Hanyu Pinyin: Dōngjīng

汴梁
- Chinese: 汴梁
Transcriptions
Standard Mandarin
- Hanyu Pinyin: Biànliáng

开封
- Chinese: 開封
Transcriptions
Standard Mandarin
- Hanyu Pinyin: Kāifēng

Bianjing (汴京; Biànjīng) is a historical name for Kaifeng, in Henan, China. The city was the capital of the Northern Song dynasty from 960 to 1127. It was also known as Dongjing (Eastern Capital), and later as Bianliang. Under the Yuan dynasty, it became the administrative seat of Bianliang Circuit and of Henan Jiangbei Province.

== History ==
During the Tang dynasty, the city was known as Bianzhou. In 781, its governor Li Mian built a new city wall. During the Five Dynasties and Ten Kingdoms period, it served as the capital of the Later Liang, Later Jin, Later Han and Later Zhou dynasties. The Song retained it as their capital in 960.

In 1127, Jurchen forces of the Jin dynasty captured the city, ending its role as the Northern Song capital. Under Jin rule, it was designated Nanjing (Southern Capital). The Jin court moved there in 1214 after the Mongol advance against Zhongdu. Mongols captured the city in 1233.

In 1288, the Yuan government renamed Nanjing Circuit Bianliang Circuit, with its seat at the city. The city also became the seat of the Henan Jiangbei provincial secretariat, established in 1291 to administer territory south of the Yellow River and north of the Yangtze. At the beginning of the Ming dynasty in 1368, the circuit was reorganized as Kaifeng Prefecture.

== Urban layout and economy ==
By the Northern Song period, the city had three walled enclosures: the palace city, the inner city and the outer city. The outer wall originated in an expansion under the Later Zhou in 956 to enclose the suburbs and had a circumference of about 27 kilometres (17 mi). A broad imperial avenue approached the palace from the south. The city's boundaries developed through successive expansions.

The Bian River linked the capital to the Grand Canal and the Yellow River, supporting transport and trade between northern and southern China. Commercial activity extended beyond the enclosed wards and designated markets associated with earlier capitals, and shops and services spread along the streets. During the Northern Song, the city's population grew to an estimated one million.

== Historical narratives and archaeology ==
Bridge scene, Along the River During the Qingming Festival

Dongjing Meng Hua Lu preserves descriptions of the city's markets, festivals, food and entertainment. The painting scroll Along the River During the Qingming Festival depicts urban scenes used to study the life of the Song capital. A fourteenth-century plan in the Shilin Guangji presents an idealized city derived from classical planning principles rather than a survey of the Song capital.

Excavations beneath modern Kaifeng have identified Song city walls at Shuntianmen and remains of the Bian River channel at Zhouqiao and Xiaosongcheng. Later structures frequently overlie earlier ones: the Ming bridge at Zhouqiao was built on its Song predecessor, and Ming and Qing city walls followed the foundations of Song and Jin inner walls. These remains demonstrate continuity in parts of the city's layout through successive rebuildings.

Yellow River floods buried buildings, roads and occupation deposits beneath sediment. The 1642 Yellow River flood, which devastated the Ming city, left a thick clay deposit over urban remains; further deposits record the flood of 1841. These layers preserve portions of older cities beneath modern Kaifeng and provide a record of river flooding and urban reconstruction.
