= Dongjing Meng Hua Lu =

Literary work

Dongjing Meng Hua Lu (simplified Chinese: 东京梦华录; traditional Chinese: 東京夢華錄; pinyin: Dōngjīng Mèng Huà Lù; lit. 'Dreams of Splendor of the Eastern Capital') or The Eastern Capital: A Dream of Splendor, is a memoir written by Meng Yuanlao (Chinese: 孟元老) (c. 1090-1150). In 1126, Meng was made a refugee from Kaifeng (Dongjing; "Eastern Capital"), the thriving capital of the Northern Song dynasty after Jin dynasty conquered northern China and forced the withdrawal of the Song court to the temporary capital, Hangzhou, in the south, then known as Lin'an. Meng's book is a detailed and nostalgic description of the old capital's urban life, seasonal products, and festivals, as well as foods, customs, and traditions. In later dynasties, the book was much imitated and taken as an authoritative picture of affluent Chinese culture.

Nothing else is known of the author, evidently a minor government official, except that he lived in Bianjing (汴京) (now called Kaifeng, in Henan province) between the ages of 13 and 27 before escaping to the south. His book was first printed in 1187, but the Preface is dated 1147, a number of years after the capital was moved, indicating that Meng started a draft at this point. The work was published in 10 volumes (juan) and traditional bibliographers classified it as travel writing. It is often cited under the abbreviated name, Meng Hua lu.

== The meaning of the title ==
The literal meaning of the title is Dongjing (Eastern Capital, that is, Kaifeng), meng (dream), Hua (the ancient land of perfection) lu (record).

The allusion is to the Yellow Emperor's dream of the land of Hua Xu, "a sphere of perfect joy and harmony," where people knew no fear, selfishness, avarice, or pain. When he awoke, the Yellow Emperor came to the realization that the Way could not be achieved through the passions. By using the term, Meng Yuanlao in ironic contrast implies that he himself awoke to a world of "perfect shambles." The historian Wu Pei-yi adds that the Chinese word meng and the English word "dream" have quite different overtones: "In modern English usage dreams are often projected into the future: they stand for hopes or wishes. In China dreams are frequently used as figures for the past." Other uses of the word meng in Chinese literature include the 18th century novel, Honglou Meng (Dream of the Red Chamber) and the 13th century essay, Mengliang lu (Dreaming Over a Bowl of Millet), which is modeled on Menghua lu.

== The Dream of Hua ==
Meng's Preface (dated 1147) tells the reader of the old capital:

Peace stretched on day after day; people were many and all things were in abundance. Youths with trailing locks practiced naught but drumming and dancing, the aged with white speckled [hair] recognized neither shield nor spear. Season and festival followed one upon the other, each with its own sights to enjoy. Lamplit nights there were and moonlit eves, periods of snow and times of blossoming, beseeching skills and climbing heights, training reservoirs and gardens to roam in. Raise the eyes and there were green bowers and painted chambers, embroidered gates and pearly shades. Decorated chariots vied to park in the Heavenly Avenue and bejeweled horses competed to spur through the Imperial Street. Gold and kingfisher dazzled the eye, silky cloth and silken gauze let float their perfumes. ... New sounds and sly giggles were found in the willowy lanes and flowered paths, pipes were fingered and strings were harmonized in the tea districts and wine wards. (Translation by Steven W. West)

The preface boasts: "The treasures and curiosities from around the world are gathered here, all are sold on the market. The exquisite scents from all over the world were to be found here." Meng must have been well placed and had enough money to take advantage of the city's pleasures. He also describes imperial rituals, although he may have heard of them second hand.

== Restaurants, street performers, and nightlife ==
The scholar Wu Pei-yi writes that "what distinguishes the book from other writings on cities is its detailed description of everyday life as it was lived in the streets and marketplaces.... Food and drink seem to have been everyone's preoccupation." Meng delights in street entertainments which serious writers disdained, even mentioning the performers by name:

Wildman Zhao would eat and drink while hung upside down.... Hua Zhuoer would sing medleys; Big Head Wen and Little Cao would play the lute; Dang Qian would perform with wind instruments.... Zou Yi and Tian Di would impersonate rustic visitors to the capital.... Yin Chang would regale his listeners with stories from the history of the Five Dynasties; Liu Baiqiin would have his birds and beasts demonstrate tricks; Yang Wenxiu would play the drum and the flute....

The descriptions of food include over one hundred famous dishes and snacks, local specialties, street snacks, as well as reflections on famous taverns, restaurants, pasta and noodle restaurant. The book is thus an important source for the history of Chinese food and drinking culture. It even describes regional cuisines during the Northern Song dynasty. The numerous mentions of Sichuan cuisine are particularly striking.

The evocation of an evening at a restaurant is particularly vivid:

When the guests arrive, a single person holding chopsticks and a menu questions all of the seated guests. The men of the capital are extravagant and they demand a hundred different things- some hot, some cold, some warm, some regular, some extremely cold-and things like noodles laced with lean and fatty meat. Everyone orders something different. The waiter takes the orders and draws near a counter where he stands in line and recites [the orders] off from the start.... in a little while the waiter sticks three bowls in his left hand, then piles up about twenty dishes along his right arm from hand to shoulder, distributing them in complete accordance with each person's order. Not the slightest error is allowed.

== Qingming Festival ==
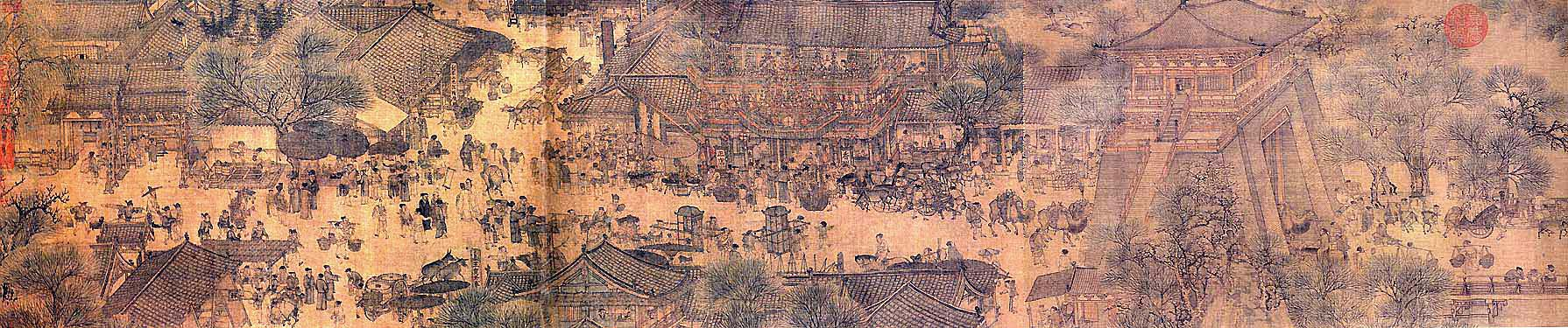
Qingming Shanghe Tu Street scene: teahouses, restaurants, vendors, homes.

The section in Book 7 describing Spring festival has been used to explain one of China's most famous scroll paintings, the Qingming Shanghe tu (清明上河圖) of Zhang Zeduan (張擇端), which was taken as depicting the Spring Festival:

The new graves are visited on this day and cleaned, the people of the capital (Bianjing) go to the suburbs ...... When they return in the evening, wear all muted flat pancakes, clay figures, toy knives, precious flowers, exotic fruits, toy models made of clay (landscapes, buildings, people, etc.), (lucky) game accessories, duck eggs or chicks with him, call that they are "gifts from outside the (city) gates." Litters are decorated with various flowers and willow branches, all four sides are covered."

== Literary value and influence ==
Evaluations of the literary style differ. Meng's own preface describes his language as "coarse and vulgar" and "not adorned by literary style." He warns: "Reader, please take careful note of this!" For many years Chinese critics agreed that the prose was of low quality because it mixed colloquialisms and poorly written literary Chinese. The modern expert Steven West, however, suggests that this inconsistent style resulted when Meng mixed passages from a journal of some kind with later compositions, then used slang and technical terms. Wu Pei-yi, another recent historian, believes that the book's appeal lies in "the elements of style that it shares with the modern art of photography: the vivid and minute inventory of visual detail, the refusal to delve behind the facade, the preoccupation with the present moment, and the concealment of a narrator."

== The performance of Dongjing Menghua Lu ==
"Song Dynasty-Dongjing Menghua" is a performance on the water in Qingming River Park in Kaifeng. The performance lasts 70 minutes, and there are more than 700 actors involved.

== Translations ==
In addition to the excerpts mentioned above, Stephen H. West has translated selections in Victor H. Mair et al., eds., Hawai'i Reader in Traditional Chinese Culture (Honolulu: University of Hawai'i Press, 2005), 405–22.
