= Huayi tu =

Earliest surviving map of China

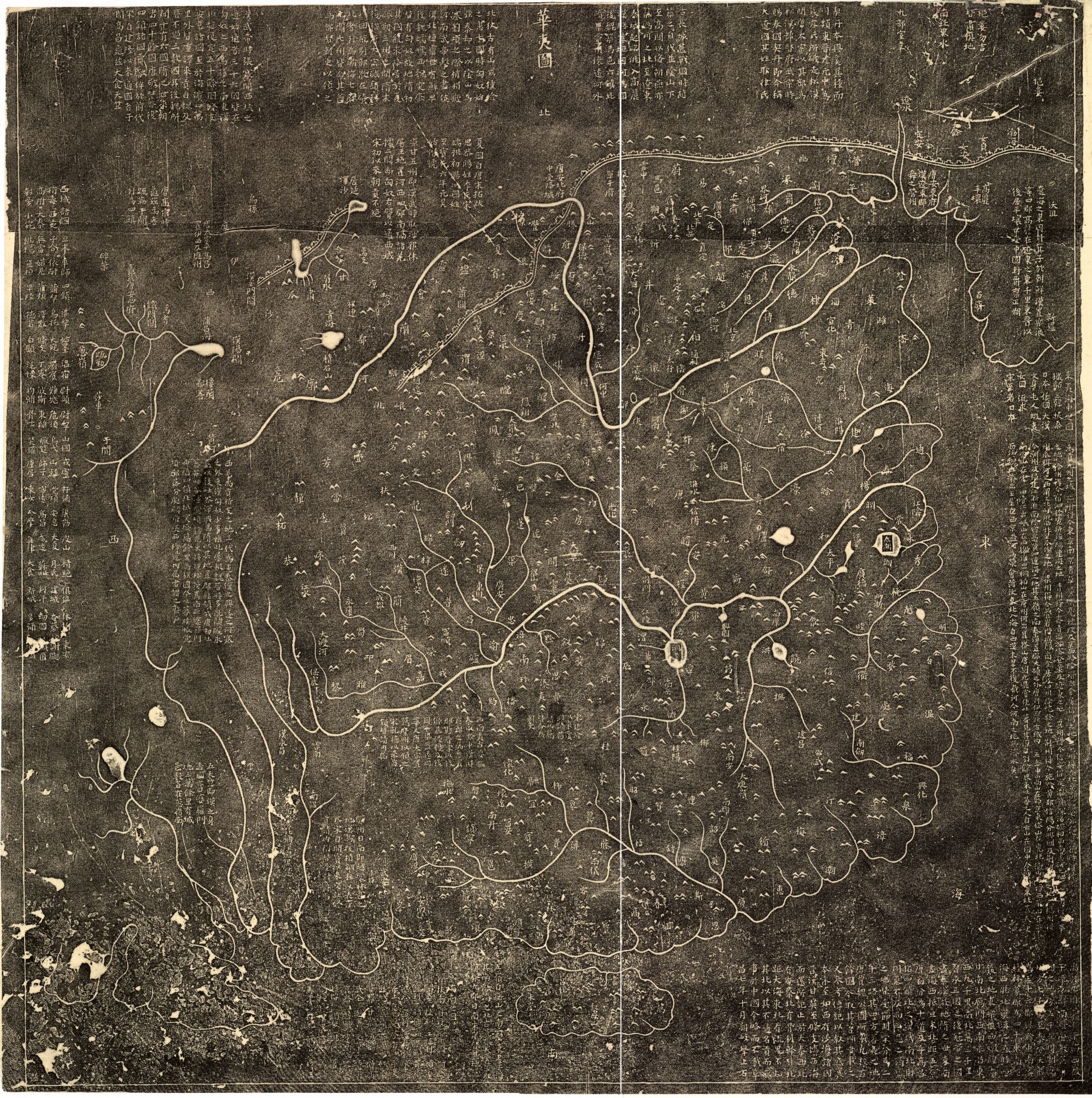
A 1933(?) rubbing of the Huayi tu stele from the Library of Congress. The actual size is about three feet square.

The Hua Yi Tu (華夷圖, Map of China and the Barbarian Countries) is a map engraved as a stone stele dated from 1136, around the time of the Song dynasty. It is the earliest surviving map that displays maritime connections between China and other foreign states. The stele is now in the Stele Forest or Beilin Museum (碑林; pinyin: Bēilín) in Xi'an, China.

== Features ==
The map measures 79 cm high and 78 cm wide. It depicts mountains, rivers, lakes, as well as more than 400 administrative place names within China. It covers an area bounded in the north by the Great Wall of China, northeast by the present-day Heilongjiang province, extending south to the island of Hainan. At the edges of the map are a few other states such as Korea (Goryeo) on the northeast and India (Tianzhu) on the southwest.

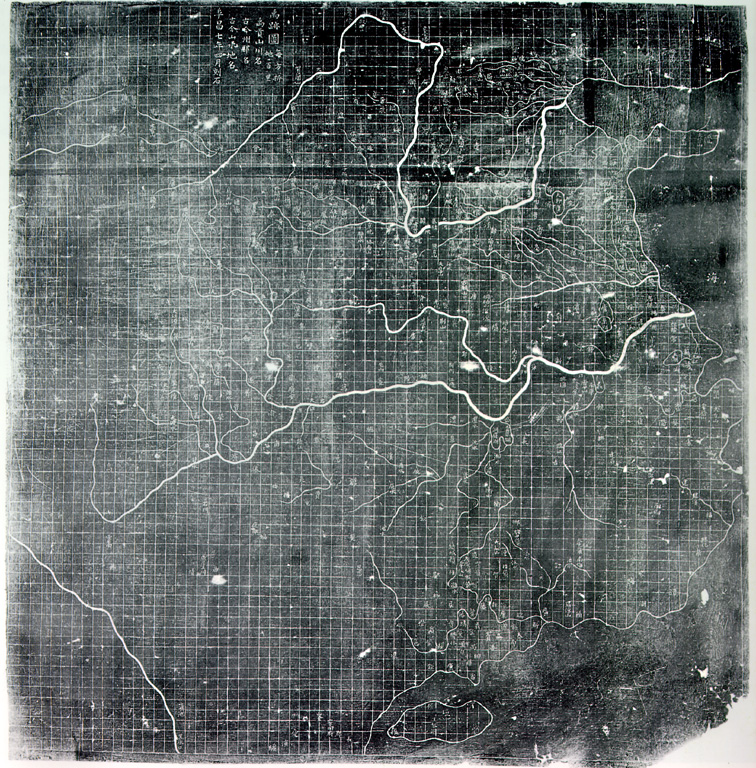
Rubbing of Yuji Tu

The map of China is surrounded by blocks of texts, which references back to the Tang dynasty map of Jia Dan (scholar and cartographer) called Hainei Huayi Tu (Map of China and the Barbarian Countries within the Seas) presented to Emperor Dezong of Tang in 801. The later Huayi Tu map covers China during the Jin and Southern Song dynasty. The texts arranged around the edges of the map provides information from historical and other sources briefly explaining markers such as the Great Wall, the size of the empire, brief descriptions of Korea, Japan and other foreign states as well as lists of the states to the south and west of China.

On the reverse side of the Huayi tu is the gridded Yu Ji Tu (Map of the Tracks of Yu the Great), carved in 1142. This is the earliest surviving example of a lattice cartographic grid found in a Chinese map.
