= Chinese exploration =

2nd-century BC – 15th-century travels abroad

Chinese exploration includes exploratory Chinese travels abroad, on land and by sea, from the travels of Han dynasty diplomat Zhang Qian into Central Asia during the 2nd century BC until the Ming dynasty treasure voyages of the 15th century that crossed the Indian Ocean and reached as far as East Africa.

== Land exploration ==
=== Pamir Mountains and beyond ===
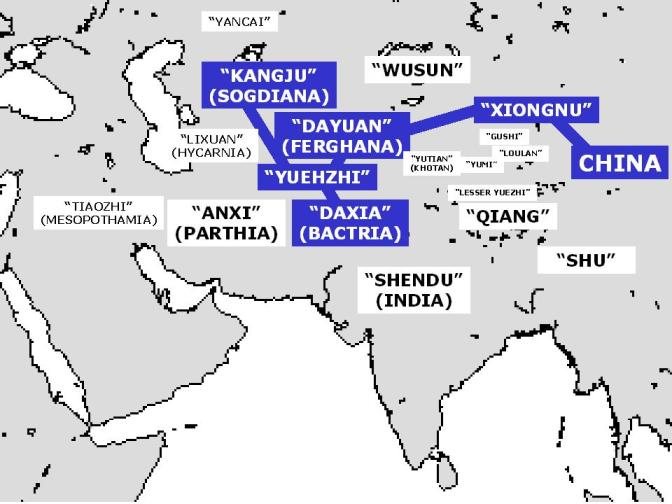
Countries described in Zhang Qian's report (visited countries are highlighted in blue).

The Western Han envoy Zhang Qian traveled beyond the Tarim Basin in the 2nd century BC, introducing the Chinese to the kingdoms of Central Asia, Hellenized Persia, India, and the Middle East in search of allies against the Xiongnu.

From 104 to 102 BC, Emperor Wu of Han waged war against the "Yuezhi" who controlled "Dayuan", a Hellenized kingdom of Fergana established by Macedonian king Alexander the Great in 329 BC. Emperor Wu also expanded Han territories beyond the Gansu corridor into the Western Regions, in what is now Xinjiang. Han military control of the region was established with the Protectorate of the Western Regions, but the Tarim Basin states were only loosely under Han control as tributary vassals on the western frontier.

In 97 AD, Gan Ying, the emissary of Eastern Han General Ban Chao, traveled as far as the Persian Gulf in the Parthian Empire, but was deterred by his Parthian hosts who falsely informed him that the journey to the Roman Empire necessitated an arduous trip around the Arabian Peninsula. Nevertheless, he returned to the Han court with a report describing the Mediterranean civilization of ancient Rome (called "Daqin" in Chinese historiography). After these initial discoveries, the focus of Chinese exploration shifted to the maritime sphere, although the Silk Road leading all the way to Europe continued to be China's most lucrative source of trade.

The pilgrimage of the Buddhist monk Xuanzang from Chang'an to Nalanda in India not only greatly increased the knowledge of Buddhism in China – returning more than 650 texts including the Heart and the Perfection of Wisdom Sutras – and inspired the immensely influential novel Journey to the West, but it also led to Xuanzang's publication of the Great Tang Records on the Western Regions, a text which introduced China to Indian cities such as the port of Calicut and recorded many details of 7th-century Bengal for posterity.

== Maritime exploration ==
=== South China Sea ===
Before the advent of the Chinese-invented mariner's compass in the 11th century, the seasonal monsoon winds controlled navigation, blowing north from the equatorial zone in the summer and south in the winter. This most likely accounts for the ease with which Neolithic travelers from mainland China were able to settle on the island of Taiwan in prehistoric times. After defeating the last of the Warring States and consolidating an empire over China proper, the Chinese navy of the Qin dynasty period (221–206 BC) assisted the land-borne invasion of Guangzhou and northern Vietnam. (Called first Jiaozhi and then Annan, the northern half of Vietnam would not become fully independent from Chinese rule until AD 938.) In 1975, an ancient shipyard excavated in Guangzhou was dated to the early Han dynasty (202 BC – AD 220) and, with three platforms, was able to construct ships that were approximately 30 m (98 ft) in length, 8 m (26 ft) in width, and could hold a weight of 60 metric tons.

During the Three Kingdoms, travelers from Eastern Wu are known to have explored the coast. The most important were Zhu Ying and Kang Tai, both sent by the Governor of Guangzhou and Jiaozhi Lü Dai in the early 3rd century. Although each wrote a book, both were lost by the 11th century: Zhu's Record of the Curiosities of Phnom (t 扶南異物誌, s 扶南异物志, Fúnán Yìwù Zhì) in its entirety and Kang's Tales of Foreign Countries During the Wu Period (t 吳時外國傳, s 吴时外国传, Wúshí Wàiguó Zhuàn) only surviving in scattered references in other works, including the Shuijing Zhu and the Yiwen Leiju.

Later, during the Eastern Jin, a rebel known as Lu Xun managed to fend off an attack by the imperial army for a hundred days in 403 before sailing down into the South China Sea from a coastal commandery. For six years, he occupied Panyu, the largest southern seaport of that time.

=== Southeast Asia ===
Between the 15th and 18th centuries, much of Southeast Asia was explored by Chinese merchants. Some parts of Malaysia were settled by Chinese families at this time, and Chinese garrisons established Similarly, some Chinese traders settled in north Java in the 1400s, and after China legitimized foreign trade again in 1567 (licensing 50 junks a year), hundreds of Chinese trade colonies developed in what is now Malaysia, Indonesia and the Philippines.

=== Indian Ocean and beyond ===
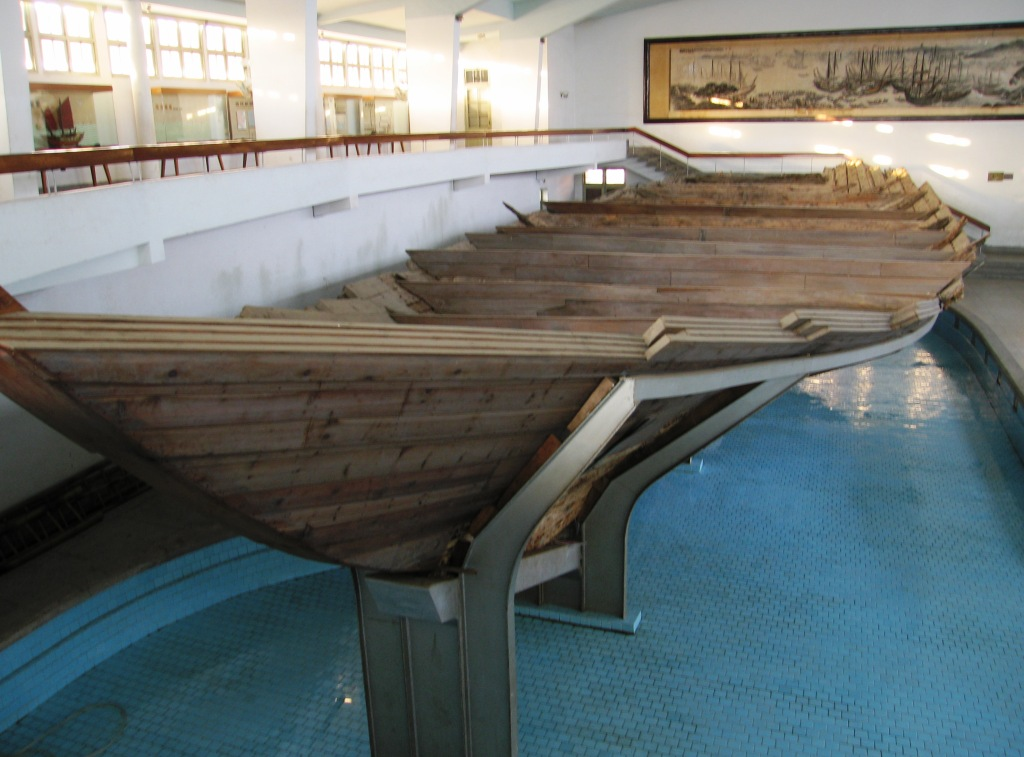
A Song dynasty junk ship, 13th century; Chinese ships of the Song period featured hulls with watertight compartments

Chinese envoys sailed into the Indian Ocean from the late 2nd century BC, and reportedly reached Kanchipuram in India, known as Huangzhi (黄支) to them, or otherwise Ethiopia as asserted by Ethiopian scholars. During the late 4th and early 5th centuries, Chinese pilgrims like Faxian, Zhiyan, and Tanwujie began to travel to India by sea, bringing Buddhist scriptures and sutras back to China. By the 7th century, as many as 31 recorded Chinese monks, including I Ching, managed to reach India the same way. In 674, the private explorer Daxi Hongtong was one of the first explorers to end his journey at the southern tip of the Arabian Peninsula, after traveling through 36 countries which were located west of the South China Sea.

Chinese seafaring merchants and diplomats who lived during the medieval Tang dynasty (618–907) and Song dynasty (960–1279) often sailed into the Indian Ocean after visiting ports in Southeast Asia. Chinese sailors would travel to Malaya, India, Sri Lanka, into the Persian Gulf and up the Euphrates River in modern-day Iraq, to the Arabian peninsula and into the Red Sea, stopping to trade goods in Ethiopia and Egypt (as Chinese porcelain was highly valued in old Fustat, Cairo). Jia Dan wrote Route between Guangzhou and the Barbarian Sea during the late 8th century that documented foreign communications, the book was lost, but the Xin Tangshu retained some of his passages about the three sea-routes linking China to East Africa. Jia Dan also wrote about tall lighthouse minarets in the Persian Gulf, which were confirmed a century later by Ali al-Masudi and al-Muqaddasi. Beyond the initial work of Jia Dan, other Chinese writers accurately described Africa from the 9th century onwards; For example, Duan Chengshi wrote in 863 of the slave trade, ivory trade, and ambergris trade of Berbera, Somalia. Seaports in China such as Guangzhou and Quanzhou – the most cosmopolitan urban centers in the medieval world – hosted thousands of foreign travelers and permanent settlers. Chinese junk ships were even described by the Moroccan geographer Al-Idrisi in his Geography of 1154, along with the usual goods they traded and carried aboard their vessels.

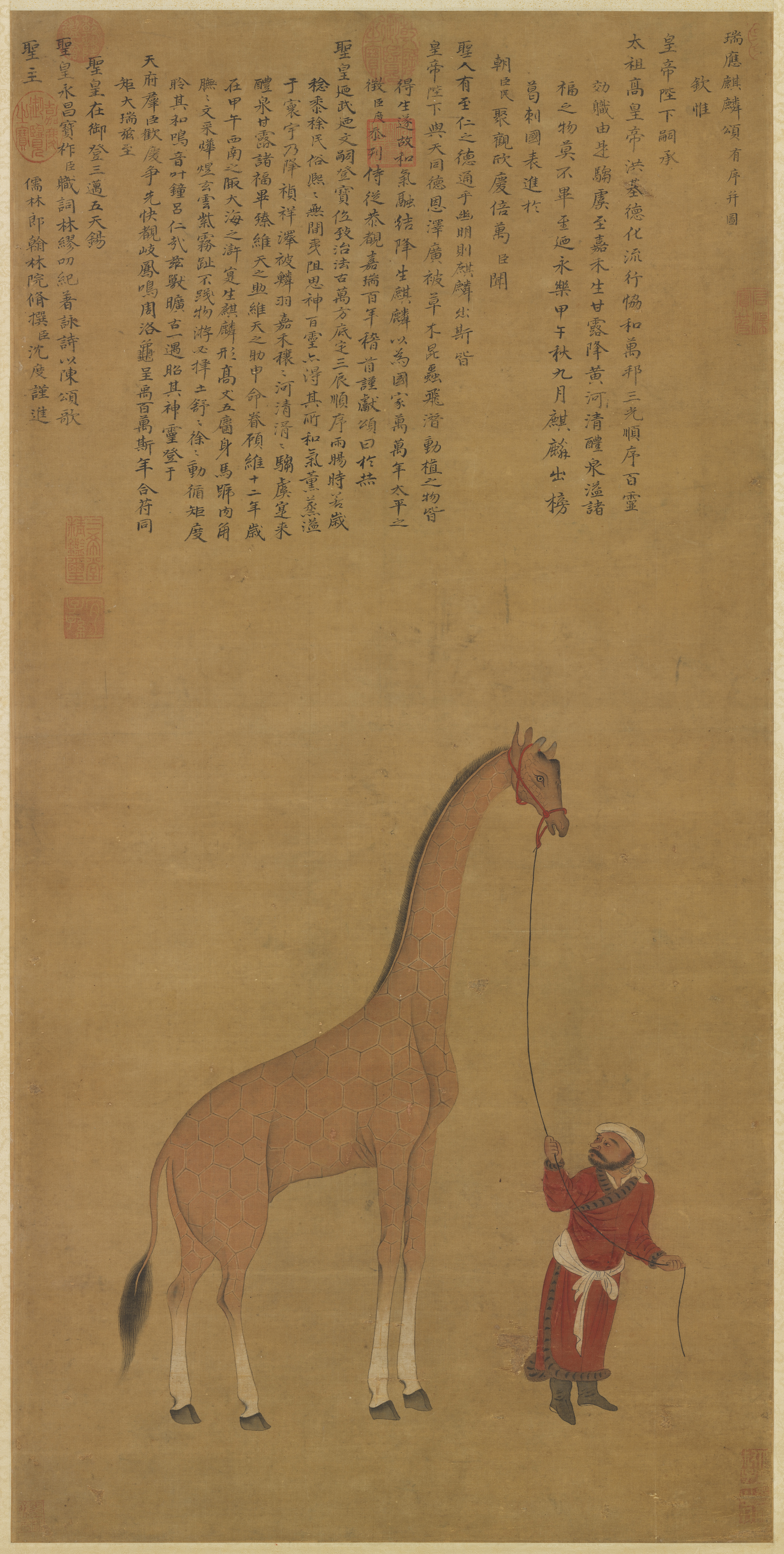
A giraffe brought from Somalia in the twelfth year of Yongle (1414)

From 1405 to 1433, large fleets commanded by Admiral Zheng He – under the auspices of the Yongle Emperor of the Ming dynasty – traveled to the Indian Ocean seven times. This attempt did not lead China to global expansion, as the Confucian bureaucracy under the next emperor reversed the policy of open exploration and by 1500, it became a capital offence to build a seagoing junk with more than two masts. Chinese merchants became content trading with already existing tributary states nearby and abroad. To them, traveling far east into the Pacific Ocean represented entering a broad wasteland of water with uncertain benefits of trade.

=== Exchanges ===
Chinese Muslims traditionally credit the Muslim traveler Sa`d ibn Abi Waqqas with introducing Islam to China in 650, during the reign of Emperor Gaozong of Tang, although modern secular scholars did not find any historical evidence for him actually travelling to China. In 1008 the Fatimid Egyptian sea-captain Domiyat, in the name of his ruling Imam Al-Hakim bi-Amr Allah, travelled to the Buddhist pilgrimage-site in Shandong in order to seek out Emperor Zhenzong of Song with gifts from his court. This reestablished diplomatic ties between China and Egypt which had been broken since the Five Dynasties and Ten Kingdoms period (907–960). The trade embassy of the Indian ruler Kulothunga Chola I to the court of Emperor Shenzong of Song in 1077 proved an economic benefactor for both empires.

== Technique ==
In China, the invention of the stern-mounted rudder appeared as early as the 1st century AD, allowing for better steering than using the power of oarsmen. The Cao Wei Kingdom engineer and inventor Ma Jun (c. 200–265 AD) built the first south-pointing chariot, a complex mechanical device that incorporated a differential gear in order to navigate on land, and (as one 6th-century text alludes) by sea as well. Much later the Chinese polymath scientist Shen Kuo (1031–1095 AD) was the first to describe the magnetic needle-compass, along with its usefulness for accurate navigation by discovering the concept of true north. In his Pingzhou Table Talks of 1119 AD the Song dynasty maritime author Zhu Yu described the use of separate bulkhead compartments in the hulls of Chinese ships. This allowed for water-tight conditions and ability of a ship not to sink if one part of the hull became damaged.

== See also ==
- Silk Road
- Age of Discovery
- Maritime history
- Naval history
- Chinese geography
- Fusang
- Naval history of China
- List of Chinese discoveries
- Zheng He
- Gavin Menzies, pseudohistorian known for claiming that Chinese explorers discovered America in the 15th century
- Pre-Columbian trans-oceanic contact theories § Claims of Chinese contact
- List of China-related topics
- Arcadio Huang, a 17th-century Chinese visitor to Europe
- Fan Shouyi, an 18th-century Chinese visitor to Europe
- Michael Shen Fu-Tsung, a 17th-century Chinese visitor to Europe
- Wang Dayuan, a Chinese visitor to North Africa in the 14th century
- A Record of Buddhist Practices Sent Home from the Southern Sea
- Great Tang Records on the Western Regions
