= Shilin Guangji =

Yuan dynasty encyclopedia and geography book

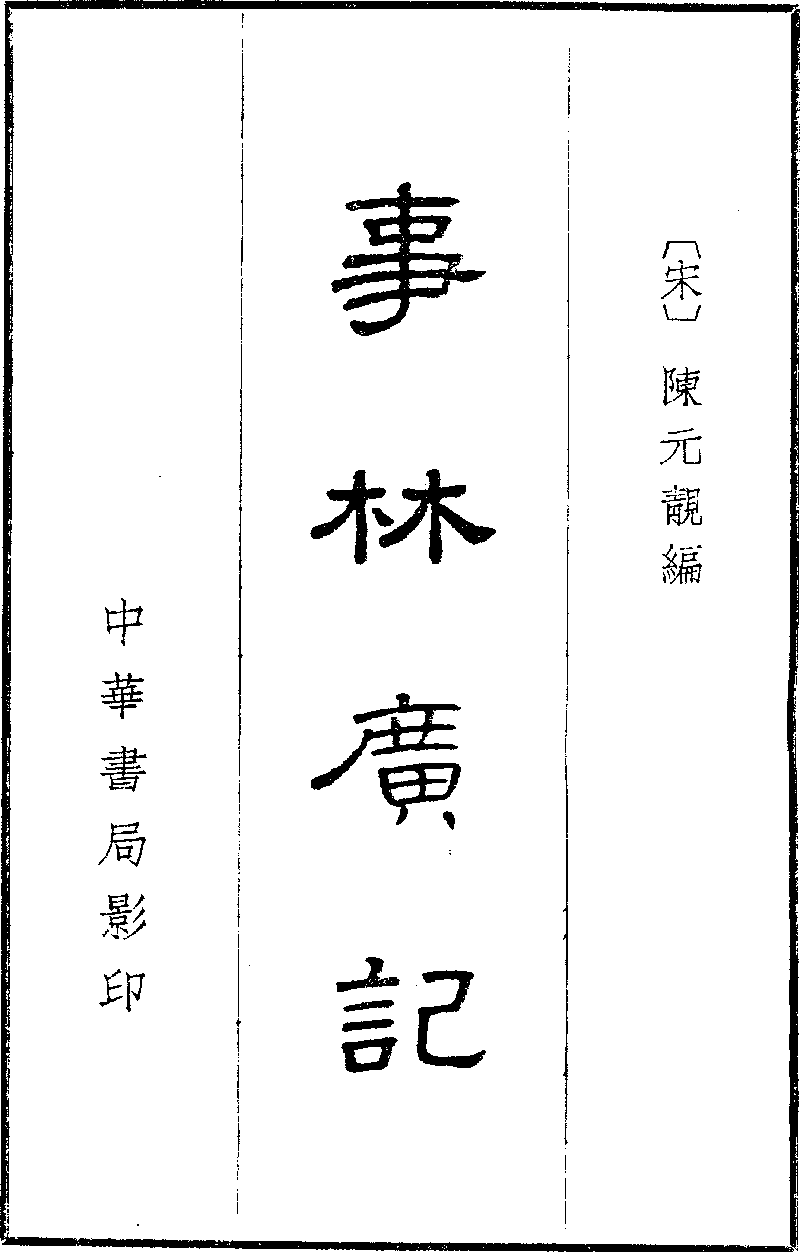
Cover of Shilin Guangji by Chen Yuanjing

Shilin Guangji (simplified Chinese: 事林广记; traditional Chinese: 事林廣記) is an encyclopedia written by Chen Yuanjing during the Yuan dynasty. The book contains text written in Chinese characters, Mongolian script, and the ʼPhags-pa script. Chen Yuanjing was a native of Chong'an (崇安) in Fujian and was born during the later years of the Southern Song dynasty. The encyclopedia contains a wealth of info on the daily life during the Mongol Empire and Yuan dynasty, including illustrations, maps and cartography. Among historical texts, it was easy to understand and popular even after the Yuan dynasty. Chen's book was used by scholars during the Ming and Qing dynasties to compile their own encyclopedias.

Based on dates within the text, it has been deduced that Chen wrote the book in the early Yuan during the reign of Kublai (Emperor Shizu of Yuan). The original manuscript has been lost, but printed copies made in the Yuan dynasty, Ming dynasty, and Japan still exist with expansions and modifications. Chen's Shilin Guangji served as an example and foundation for later Chinese encyclopedias such as the Sancai Tuhui (Ming dynasty) and Gujin Tushu Jicheng (Qing dynasty).

== Translation ==
The Shilin Guangji is sometimes translated as Vast Record from the Forest of Affairs, Comprehensive Record of Affairs,Vast Record of Varied Matters, A Widely Comprehensive Record of a Forest of Affairs, or simply Forest of Affairs.

== Contents ==
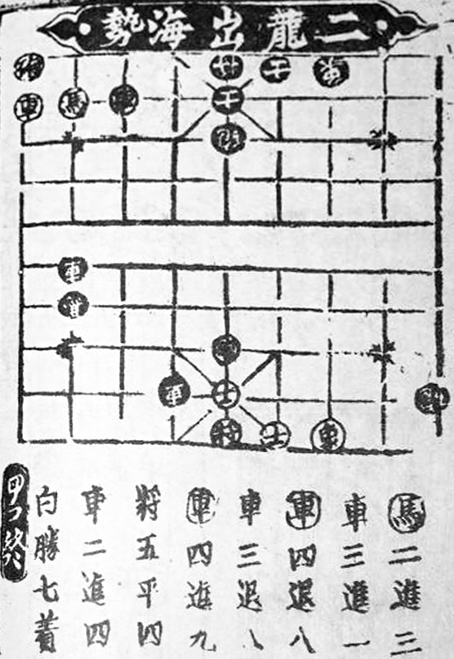
Illustration of Chinese chess in the Shilin Guangji

The book contains 42 volumes (卷) and has been described as an everyday encyclopedia or leishu (日用类书). The volumes are divided into 10 parts and arranged according to the Ten Heavenly Stems.

The book describes life during the Southern Song as well as life during the Yuan dynasty. In the encyclopedia of the Yuan dynasty, a map of the Yuan was drawn: The Great Yuan all in One Map (大元混一图), including the capital cities of Shangdu and Dadu (Khanbaliq or Beijing). It then introduces:

- the counties and cities of the Yuan,
- the Mongolian script,
- fonts,
- ʼPhags-pa script (an official script of the Mongol Empire),
- the Hundred Family Surnames, including a version written in the Phagspa script (百家姓蒙古文),
- the Yuan dynasty currency and economic system,
- and the ancestral tree of the Yuan emperors.

It then introduces the daily life and street life of Mongol Empire citizens and pioneered the precedent of using illustrations in live encyclopedias. Illustrations include horse riding, archery, greeting customs (拜会), chariots and vehicles, flags, schools, sages, Confucius, Laozi, martial arts, banquets and cuisine, architecture, chess, soccer, magic, singing, music, guqin and zither, etc. Chen Yuanjing's Shilin Guangji became a first-hand visual source for studying Yuan dynasty history and social life during the Mongol Empire.

The encyclopedia has a section on cuisine, where it discusses fermenting agents (曲), spirits and wines (名酒、佳酿), ways to preserve meat and fish (脯、鲊), tea (茶水), and snacks made from wheat and flour (面点).

Within the book the Hundred Family Surnames poem is written in Phagspa script and recorded in a large space, with annotations in the Mongolian script. Kublai Khan's vision was to create a universal system that could write the languages of the various people unified by the Mongol Empire. Phagspa was created to transcribe languages such as Chinese, Mongolian, Tibetan, Sanskrit, Persian, Arabic, Turkic, etc. Later after the end of the Yuan dynasty, the Phagspa script fell out of general use but influenced the development of the Korean Hangul script. Chen's book is one of the extant sources of usage of the Phagspa script during the Mongol Empire, providing a source of study for historical linguistics.

== Gallery ==
The following are illustrations from the iShilin Guangji.

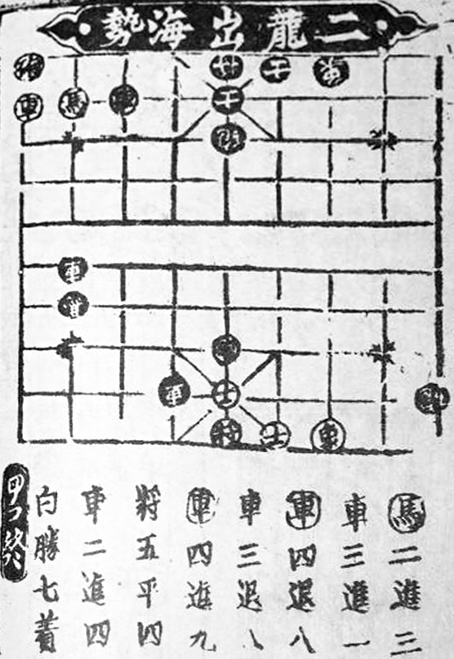
Illustration of Chinese chess in the Shilin Guangji

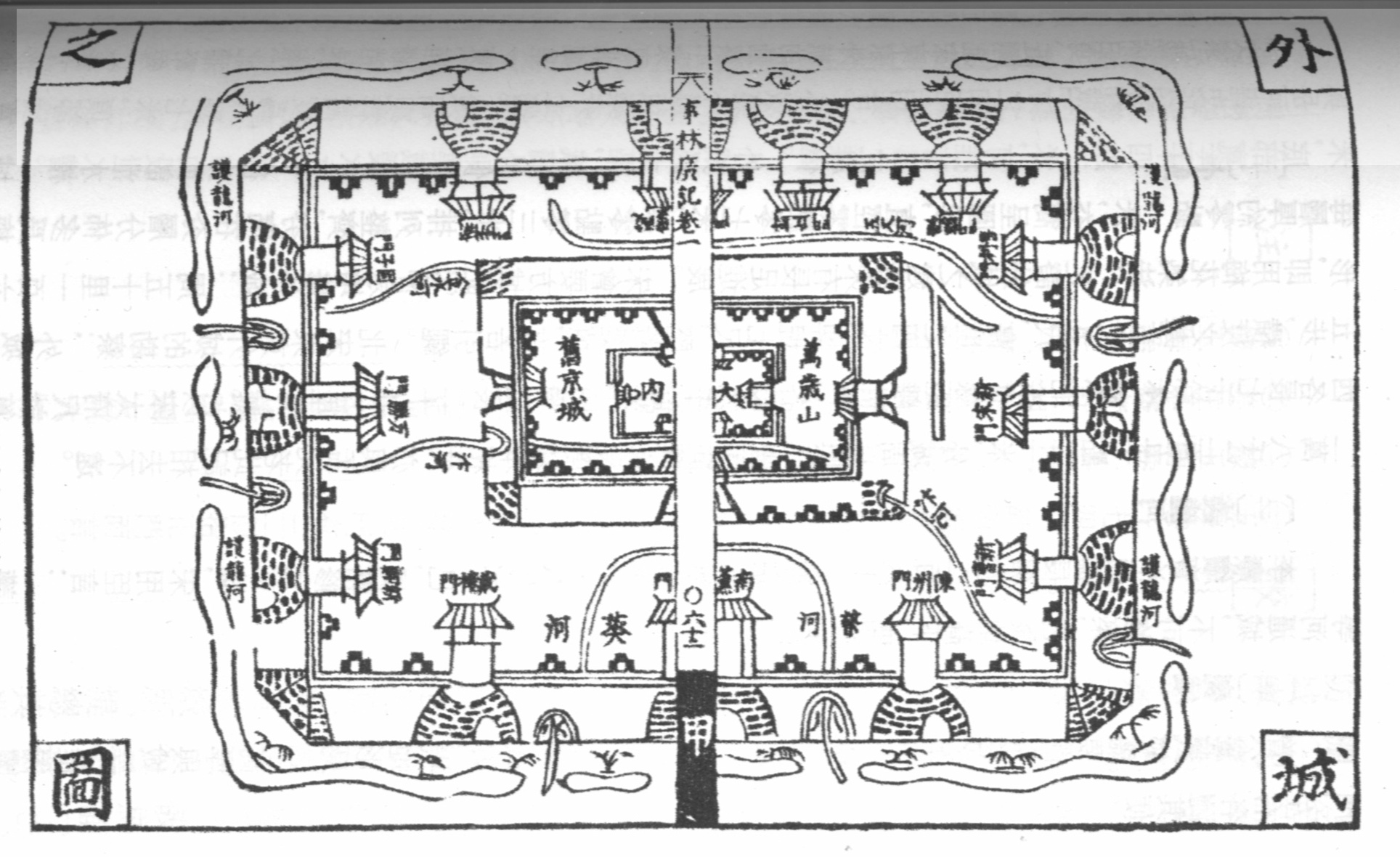
Map of Bianjing

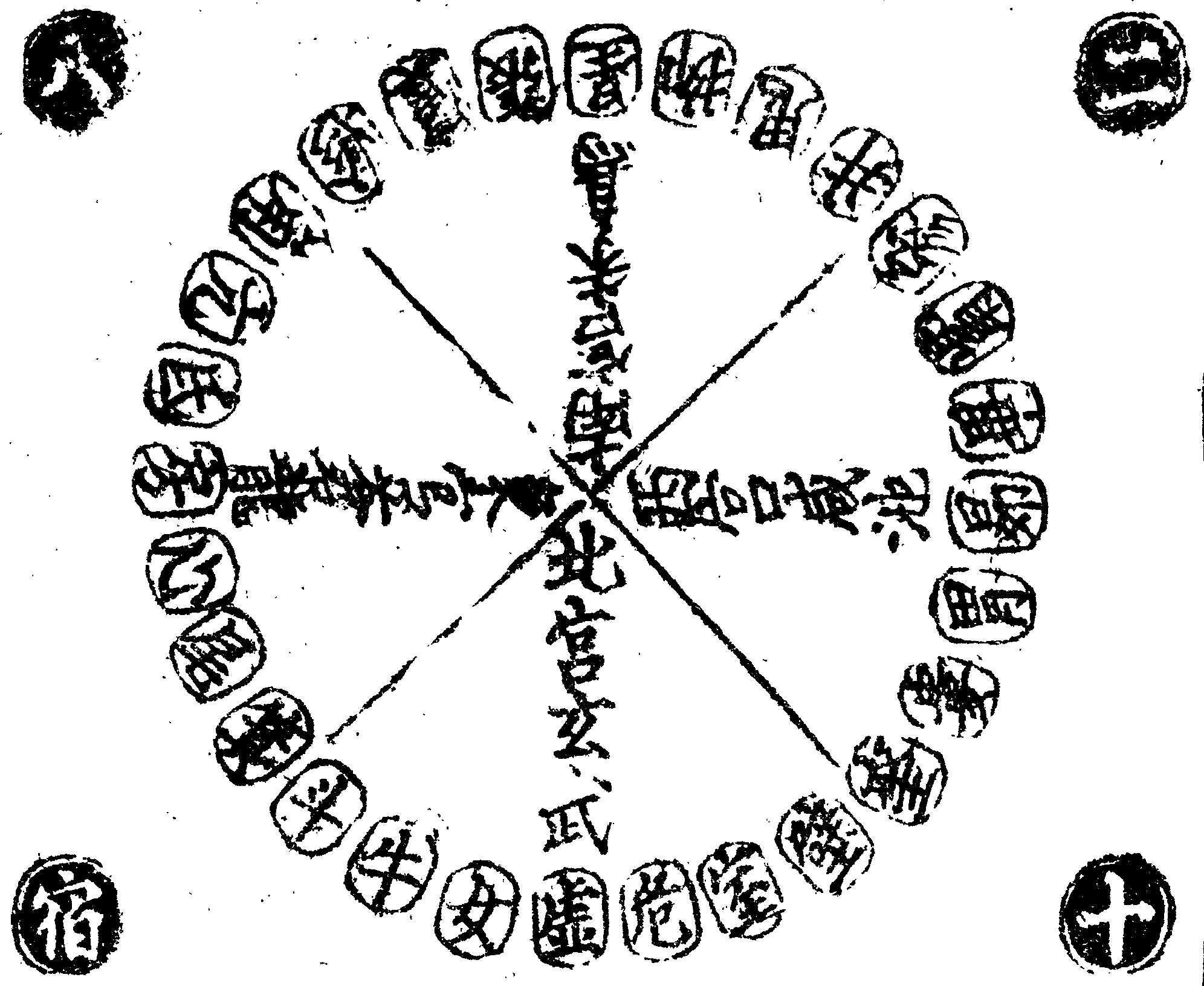
The Twenty-Eight Mansions

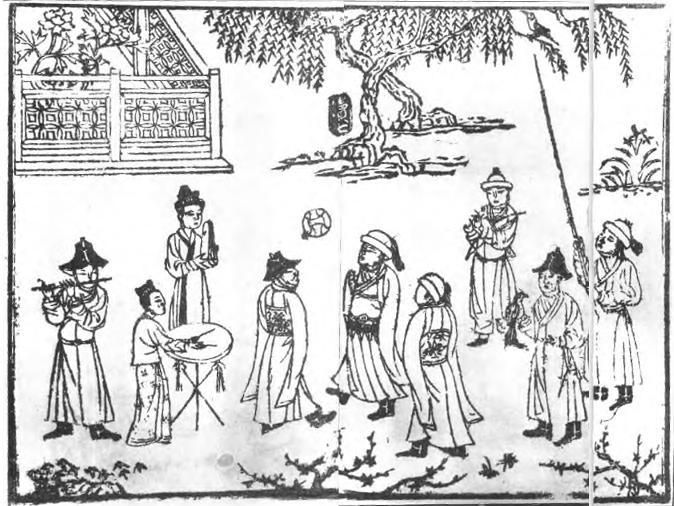
Cuju, an ancient Chinese football game

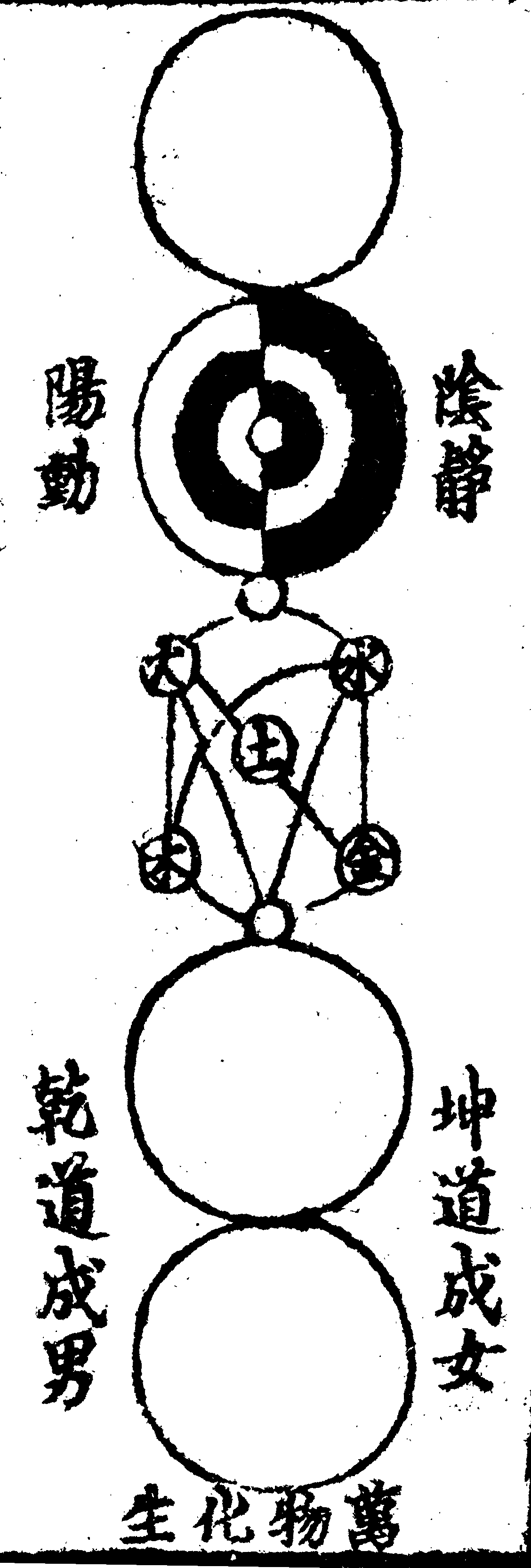
Taijitu, illustrating Yin and yang

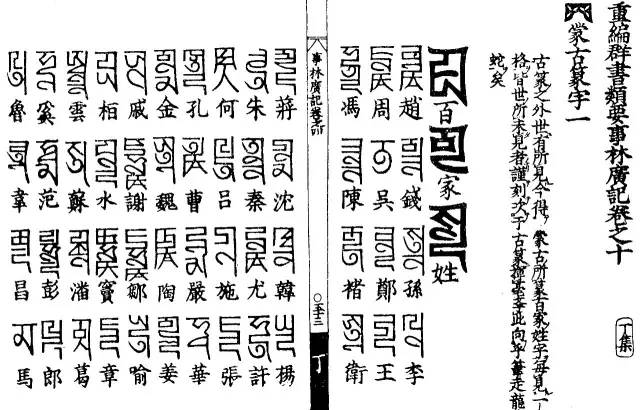
Hundred Family Surnames written in Chinese and ʼPhags-pa script

== Editions ==
The first edition of Shilin Guangji initially compiled information to prepare students for civil service examinations. Later throughout the Yuan and subsequent dynasties, various additions were made to the text in reprinted editions. Based on studies of taboo characters preserved in certain Japanese editions of the Shilin Guangji, the first edition was published in the late Song before its fall. It was then expanded and republished many times during the Yuan and in subsequent dynasties and in Japan, giving the Shilin Guangji an extensive history of publication.

=== Zhonghua edition ===
In 1963, the Zhonghua Book Company photocopied a printed edition of the Shilin Guangji during the reign of Yuan Wenzong Jayaatu Khan Tugh Temür (r. 1330–1333, Zhishun至顺) from the Jian'an Chunzhuang Academy (建安椿庄书院). This version was often quoted in academic circles. The Zhonghua photocopy edition was distributed widely by The Commercial Press and photographed by the Palace Museum before the Second Sino-Japanese War. Moreover, the scholar Hu Daojing (胡道静) added a preface detailing Chen Yuanjing's life and the contents of the edition of the Shilin Guangji.

=== Other versions ===
Since the Yuan dynasty, the book has been reprinted many times:

- Peking University library collection: Yuan dynasty Toghon Temür reign (1340, Zhiyuan Gengchen 至元庚辰), Zheng family Jichengtang edition (郑氏积诚堂刊本)
- National Palace Museum: Yuan Wenzong Jayaatu Khan Tugh Temür (r. 1330–1333, Zhishun 至顺) from the Jian'an Chunzhuang Academy (建安椿庄书院)
- 1990 edition from Shanghai Chinese classics publishing house (上海古籍出版社): photocopied text from Hekeben leishu jicheng (和刻本类书集成), including a Japanese translation of Yesün Temür's (元泰定) addendum made during the 12th year of the Genroku era (1699 元禄)
- In October 1998, it was reprinted and published by the Zhonghua Book Company
