= Chen Yuanjing =

Writer of Yuan dynasty encyclopedia Shilin Guangji

- 陳元靚
- Born: Chong'an, Jianzhou (modern-day Nanping, Fujian), Southern Song dynasty
- Died: Yuan dynasty
- Occupations: Scholar, writer
- Era: Zhongtong (中統) era of the reign of Kublai
- Known for: Shilin Guangji

Chen Yuanjing (Chinese: 陳元靚) was a scholar of the Yuan dynasty known for writing the Shilin Guangji. Chen Yuanjing was born at the end of the Southern Song dynasty in Chong'an (崇安), Jianzhou (modern-day Nanping, northwestern Fujian). He probably lived from the late 13th century to the mid-14th century.

== Life ==
Chen Yuanjing had the autograph "Guanghan Xianyi" (广寒仙裔) or descendant of (Chen) Guanghan. According to studies by Fang Yanshou (方彦寿), a certain Guanghan master could be found working around Sanguili (三桂里), Kaoting (考亭), Jianyang (建阳) in Jianzhou (Fujian) province. Chen Guanghan may have been born around Kaoting, Jianyang in Jianzhou.

Chen Yuanjing himself was born in Chong'an in modern-day Fujian, which was also his ancestral home (祖籍 / 籍贯). Chong'an is also where Guanghan was buried.

Chen Guanghan had a son named Chen Xun (陈逊), a Song dynasty person who became a jinshi in the fourth year of Emperor Zhezong (around 1098, Shaosheng 4th year 绍圣四年). Chen Yuanjing was also a descendant of Chen Xun. The other details of Chen Yuanjing's life are unknown.

== Publications ==
=== Shilin Guangji ===
During the reign of Kublai Khan of the Yuan dynasty, Chen Yuanjing wrote and published the Shilin Guangji, an encyclopedia which detailed the life during the Song and Yuan dynasties, as well as containing maps of the large Yuan empire and examples of the ʼPhags-pa script and Mongolian script. Chen's book was popular and easy to understand at the time and would be expanded and used by later scholars in the Ming and Qing dynasties as well as in Korea and Japan to learn more about Chinese history, the Yuan dynasty, and Mongol Empire. Chen's Shilin Guangji and the illustrations therein were used as a basis for later encyclopedias such as the Sancai Tuhui and Complete Classics Collection of Ancient China.

In 1684, Confucian scholar Utsunomiya Teki (宇都宮的), also called Utsunomiya Ton'an (宇都宮遯庵), wrote the following in a preface to Chen's work: "There is nothing excluded in his recording of affairs" and that "he cites his sources meticulously" and "his work for modern scholarship is no small thing."

=== Other works ===
Besides the Shilin Guangji, Chen Yuanjing is known for writing the 40 volumes of Suishi Guangji (岁时广记), Bowenlu (博闻录), and other treatises. His works are prefaced by Liu Chun (刘纯), Zhu Jian (朱鉴), and other authors, indicating that Chen Yuanjing may have been born during the reign of Emperor Lizong of Song.

The Suishi Guangji (岁时广记) or "Expansion of the Random Notes to Events of the Annual Seasons" is an annuary or book detailing customs and yearly festivals. It was an expansion of the Suishi Zaji (岁时杂记) or "Random Notes to Events of the Annual Seasons" written by Lü Xizhe (吕希哲 ca. 1080-1125). Chen's Suishi Guangji has a preface written by Zhu Jian (朱鑑/朱鉴 1190-1258), the grandson of Zhu Xi. Based on Zhu Jian's year of death, it can be deduced that Chen published the Suishi Guangji earlier and had lived during the 12th and 13th centuries.
