= Dushi Fangyu Jiyao =

Dushi Fangyu Jiyao (simplified Chinese: 读史方舆纪要; traditional Chinese: 讀史方輿紀要; lit. 'Essence of Geography or Essentials of for Reading History') is an important Chinese book written by Qing dynasty geographer Gu Zuyu (1631–1692 or 1624–1680), between 1630 and 1660. The book covers aspects of natural, historical, and administrative geography, focusing especially on topography as it affects military strategy. It lists the names of 30,000 places.
