= Jia Dan =

Jia Dan (simplified Chinese: 贾耽; traditional Chinese: 賈耽; pinyin: Jiǎ Dān, 730 – 805), courtesy name Dunshi (敦詩) and formally Duke Yuanjing of Wei (魏元靖公), was a Chinese cartographer, military general, and politician from Cangzhou, Hebei during the Tang dynasty.

== Background ==
Jia Dan was born in 730, during the reign of Emperor Xuanzong. His family was from Cang Prefecture (滄州, in modern Cangzhou, Hebei) and traced its ancestry to the Han dynasty official Jia Yi, through officials of Cao Wei, Jin dynasty (266–420), Liu Song, Southern Qi, Liang dynasty, Northern Qi, Northern Zhou, Sui dynasty, and Tang dynasty. Both his grandfather Jia Zhiyi (賈知義) and father Jia Yuanyan (賈元琰) served as county-level officials.

== Career ==
=== Early career ===
During Emperor Xuanzong's Tianbao era (742–756), Jia Dan passed the imperial examinations and was made the sheriff of Linqing County (臨清, in modern Liaocheng, Shandong). After he submitted suggestions on the matters of the times to Emperor Xuanzong, he was moved to be the sheriff of Zhengping County (正平, in modern Yuncheng, Shanxi) — closer to the capital Chang'an, and therefore considered a promotion despite it being the same level of office. While the general Wang Sili (王思禮) served as the military governor (Jiedushi) of Hedong Circuit (河東, headquartered in modern Taiyuan, Shanxi), Wang invited him to serve as secretary. While serving under Wang, Jia was promoted to be the deputy mayor of Taiyuan Municipality and deputy military governor. He later served as the prefect of Fen Prefecture (汾州, in modern Linfen, Shanxi) for seven years and was known for ruling the prefecture well.

Jia was then recalled to Chang'an to serve as the minister of vassal affairs (鴻臚卿, Honglu Qing), which included the responsibilities of receiving and entertaining foreign emissaries, as well as imperial funerals and the command of two units of the imperial guards, the Weiyuan Camp (威遠營). As the minister of vassal affairs, he would have met with foreign envoys in order to acquire information about their native countries. This included cultural customs as well as geographic information, as a map was drawn after the geographic information was acquired from the interview. Historian Edward Schafer states that it is no doubt that Jia's remarkable knowledge of foreign geography was derived from these interviews with foreign delegates and diplomats. In 779, during the reign of Emperor Xuanzong's grandson Emperor Daizong, Jia was made the prefect of Liang Prefecture (梁州, in modern Hanzhong, Shaanxi) and the military governor of Shannan West Circuit (山南西道, headquartered at Liang Prefecture).

=== During Emperor Dezong's reign ===
In 781, during the reign of Emperor Daizong's son Emperor Dezong, when Liang Chongyi, the military governor of nearby Shannan East Circuit (山南東道, headquartered in modern Xiangfan, Hubei), rebelled against Emperor Dezong's rule, Jia Dan participated in the campaign against Liang and captured Jun Prefecture (均州, in modern Shiyan, Hubei). In 782, after Liang's defeat and suicide, Jia was made the military governor of Shannan East Circuit, and in 783 participated in the campaign against another rebel general, Li Xilie the military governor of Huaixi Circuit (淮西, headquartered in modern Zhumadian, Henan.

In 784, while Emperor Dezong was at Liang Prefecture after he fled there due to rebellions by the general Zhu Ci and Li Huaiguang, there was an occasion when Jia sent his officer Fan Ze (樊澤) to make reports to Emperor Dezong. After Fan's return, there was suddenly an imperial edict issued making Fan the military governor of Shannan East Circuit and recalling Jia to Emperor Dezong's location to serve as the minister of public works (工部尚書, Gongbu Shangshu). When the edict arrived, Jia was hosting a feast, and he received the edict as if nothing had happened. After the feast was over, he informed Fan of his promotion and immediately began the transition, including having the other officers greet Fan as their new superior. The officer Zhang Xianfu (張獻甫) was angered, believing that Fan had treacherously seized Jia's position, and he wanted to kill Fan. Jia stopped him, pointing out that because Fan had imperial sanction, he was the proper military governor. That same day, he left his post and headed for the emperor's location, taking Zhang with him to avoid any further disturbance. Jia was soon made the defender of the eastern capital Luoyang.

In 786, after the death of Li Cheng (李澄) the military governor of Yicheng Circuit (義成, headquartered in modern Anyang, Henan), Jia was made the military governor of Yicheng. At that time, Li Na the military governor of neighboring Pinglu Circuit (平盧, headquartered in modern Tai'an, Shandong), who had previously rebelled against Emperor Dezong but later resubmitted (albeit nominally), was still viewed as a threat to the circuits loyal to the imperial regime. On an occasion, when Pinglu soldiers, returning from a posting to the western border with Tufan, were going through Yicheng on the way back to Pinglu, Jia's subordinates, worried that they might act against Yicheng, suggested that they be kept outside the city walls of Yicheng's headquarters Hua Prefecture (滑州). Jia, reasoning that it was improper to let soldiers from a neighboring circuit rest in the open air, welcomed them inside, and the Pinglu soldiers did not dare to create any disturbance. Jia also often hunted on the borders with Pinglu, often venturing into Pinglu territory. When Li Na received these reports, he was pleased that Jia did not consider him hostile and admired Jia for his openness, and therefore did not carry out any hostile actions against Yicheng.

In 793, Jia was recalled to Chang'an to serve as You Pushe (右僕射), one of the heads of the executive bureau of government (尚書省, Shangshu Sheng). He was also given the designation Tong Zhongshu Menxia Pingzhangshi (同中書門下平章事), making him a chancellor, serving with Lu Zhi (Tang dynasty), Zhao Jing, and Lu Mai.

In 800, when Lu Qun (盧群) the military governor of Yicheng died, Jia Dan advocated that Emperor Dezong commission a military governor without first consulting the officers of the circuit, believing that such consultation showed weakness. Emperor Dezong agreed and directly made the official Li Yuansu (李元素) the military governor of Yicheng. In 801, Jia completed a 40-volume work that included a large map of the Chinese and the non-Chinese populations, and descriptions of the various circuits of Tang as well as foreign nations (see further below). Emperor Dezong awarded him with a number of silk and silver items, as well as a horse, and created him the Duke of Wei.

=== During Emperor Shunzong's and Xianzong's reigns ===
In 805, Emperor Dezong died, and his severely ill son Li Song became emperor (as Emperor Shunzong). Emperor Shunzong's close associate Wang Shuwen became the most powerful figure at court, despite his not being a chancellor, and Wang's associates became in charge of many important matters. Jia Dan disliked Wang and his associates and thus offered to retire, but Emperor Shunzong did not approve of the retirement. Jia died later that year, after Emperor Shunzong had passed the throne to his son Li Chun (as Emperor Xianzong) and was given posthumous honors. It was said that during Jia's service as chancellor, while he had no major contributions on policy matters, he was virtuous and led by example.

== Works ==
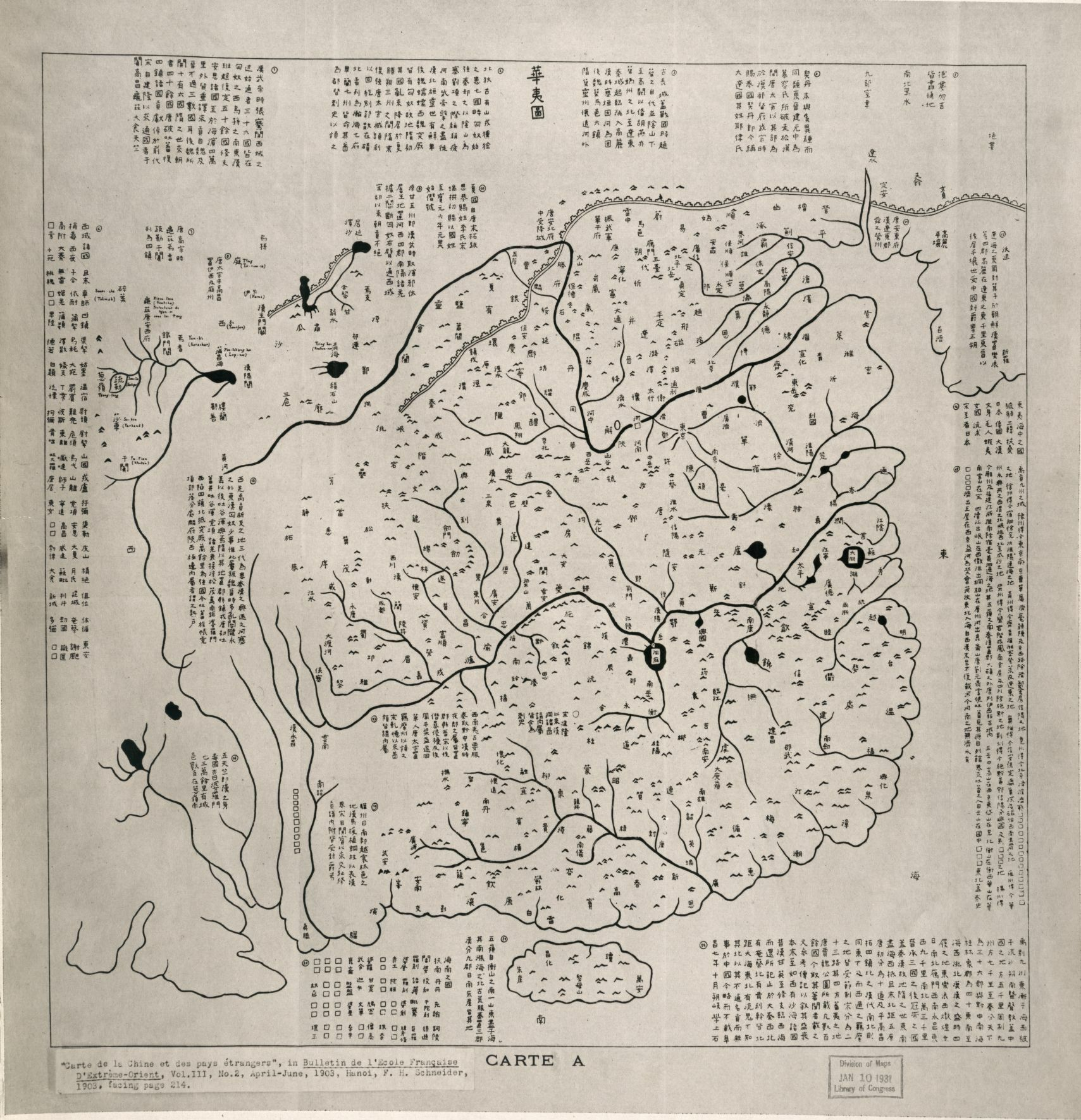
Huayi tu, a 12th-century map of China that may have been inspired by the early 9th century Jia Dan's map

Jia Dan was an important contributor to the study of geography in China, of note are his writings on foreign countries. He began to collect information for his books as early as 784, questioning Chinese and foreign envoys about the geography, origins and customs of foreign lands, and directed the Court of Ceremonials to question all foreigners and have their answers recorded precisely. He paid particular attention to foreign countries on the caravan and sea routes, and as a result of his effort, knowledge of countries outside China improved significantly. He produced a number of works on geography, including the 10-volume Huanghua Sida Ji (皇華四達記), the 40-volume Gujin Junguo Xiandao Siyi Shu (古今郡國縣道四夷述) and a map Hainei Huayi Tu (海内華夷圖, "Map of Chinese and non-Chinese Territories in the World"). The map depicted China and other countries including its former colonies in Central Asia that were lost to the Uyghurs and Tibetans. Huanghua Sida Ji was presented to Emperor Dezong of Tang in 798, while both the 40-volume book and the map were presented to the emperor in 801. Upon its completion in 801, the map was 9.1 m (30 ft) in length and 10 m (33 ft) in height, mapped out on a grid scale of one inch equaling one hundred li (Chinese unit of measuring distance). The map is lost, but a later map of China from the 1136 Huayi tu map which has names of foreign places (including those to the west of China and South East Asia) inscribed on the edges that it took the names from Jia Dan's map.

In the 40-volume work that Jia completed in 801, Jia wrote of two common sea trade routes in his day: one from the coast of the Bohai Sea towards Silla in Korea and another from Guangzhou through Malacca towards the Nicobar Islands, Sri Lanka and India, the eastern and northern shores of the Arabian Sea to the Euphrates River. Indeed, Korean vessels dominated the Yellow Sea trade, while most Japanese vessels were forced to venture towards the mouth of the Huai River and Yellow River, and even as far south as Hangzhou Bay. Jia's book contains some of the most accurate accounts of the Arab world in Tang Chinese sources. He wrote that the ships in the Euphrates had to anchor at the mouth of the Euphrates and transfer the trade goods on land towards the capital (Baghdad) of Dashi Guo (Abbasid). This was confirmed by the contemporary Arab merchant Shulama, who noted that the draft in Chinese junk ships were too deep to enter the Euphrates, forcing them to land passengers and cargo ashore on smaller boats. A small branch of this extensive second trade route led all the way to Dar es Salaam in Tanzania, East Africa. In his work written between 785 and 805, he described the sea route going into the mouth of the Persian Gulf, and that the medieval Iranians (whom he called the people of Luo-He-Yi) had erected 'ornamental pillars' in the sea with torches on it at night that acted as lighthouse beacons for ships that might go astray. Confirming Jia's reports about lighthouses in the Persian Gulf, Arabic writers a century after Jia wrote of the same structures, writers such as al-Mas'udi and al-Muqaddasi.
